

517001–517100 

|-bgcolor=#E9E9E9
| 517001 ||  || — || October 23, 2008 || Kitt Peak || Spacewatch ||  || align=right data-sort-value="0.96" | 960 m || 
|-id=002 bgcolor=#fefefe
| 517002 ||  || — || September 12, 2001 || Socorro || LINEAR ||  || align=right data-sort-value="0.82" | 820 m || 
|-id=003 bgcolor=#fefefe
| 517003 ||  || — || October 29, 2005 || Kitt Peak || Spacewatch ||  || align=right data-sort-value="0.75" | 750 m || 
|-id=004 bgcolor=#fefefe
| 517004 ||  || — || September 1, 2005 || Kitt Peak || Spacewatch ||  || align=right data-sort-value="0.56" | 560 m || 
|-id=005 bgcolor=#FA8072
| 517005 ||  || — || October 11, 2012 || Catalina || CSS ||  || align=right | 1.6 km || 
|-id=006 bgcolor=#fefefe
| 517006 ||  || — || March 15, 2007 || Mount Lemmon || Mount Lemmon Survey ||  || align=right data-sort-value="0.75" | 750 m || 
|-id=007 bgcolor=#fefefe
| 517007 ||  || — || January 31, 2006 || Kitt Peak || Spacewatch ||  || align=right data-sort-value="0.71" | 710 m || 
|-id=008 bgcolor=#fefefe
| 517008 ||  || — || October 7, 2012 || Haleakala || Pan-STARRS || V || align=right data-sort-value="0.76" | 760 m || 
|-id=009 bgcolor=#fefefe
| 517009 ||  || — || November 8, 2009 || Kitt Peak || Spacewatch ||  || align=right data-sort-value="0.71" | 710 m || 
|-id=010 bgcolor=#fefefe
| 517010 ||  || — || October 6, 2012 || Mount Lemmon || Mount Lemmon Survey || V || align=right data-sort-value="0.61" | 610 m || 
|-id=011 bgcolor=#E9E9E9
| 517011 ||  || — || October 10, 2012 || Mount Lemmon || Mount Lemmon Survey ||  || align=right | 1.0 km || 
|-id=012 bgcolor=#fefefe
| 517012 ||  || — || September 18, 2012 || Mount Lemmon || Mount Lemmon Survey ||  || align=right data-sort-value="0.84" | 840 m || 
|-id=013 bgcolor=#E9E9E9
| 517013 ||  || — || October 30, 2008 || Mount Lemmon || Mount Lemmon Survey ||  || align=right | 1.8 km || 
|-id=014 bgcolor=#E9E9E9
| 517014 ||  || — || October 9, 2012 || Mount Lemmon || Mount Lemmon Survey ||  || align=right | 2.1 km || 
|-id=015 bgcolor=#E9E9E9
| 517015 ||  || — || October 31, 2008 || Kitt Peak || Spacewatch ||  || align=right data-sort-value="0.99" | 990 m || 
|-id=016 bgcolor=#E9E9E9
| 517016 ||  || — || October 15, 2012 || Siding Spring || SSS || BAR || align=right | 1.4 km || 
|-id=017 bgcolor=#fefefe
| 517017 ||  || — || October 15, 2012 || Mount Lemmon || Mount Lemmon Survey ||  || align=right data-sort-value="0.65" | 650 m || 
|-id=018 bgcolor=#fefefe
| 517018 ||  || — || August 25, 2008 || La Sagra || OAM Obs. || MAS || align=right data-sort-value="0.81" | 810 m || 
|-id=019 bgcolor=#fefefe
| 517019 ||  || — || June 30, 2008 || Kitt Peak || Spacewatch ||  || align=right data-sort-value="0.68" | 680 m || 
|-id=020 bgcolor=#E9E9E9
| 517020 ||  || — || October 21, 2012 || Haleakala || Pan-STARRS ||  || align=right | 1.3 km || 
|-id=021 bgcolor=#fefefe
| 517021 ||  || — || October 10, 2012 || Kitt Peak || Spacewatch ||  || align=right data-sort-value="0.89" | 890 m || 
|-id=022 bgcolor=#fefefe
| 517022 ||  || — || October 19, 2012 || Haleakala || Pan-STARRS ||  || align=right data-sort-value="0.91" | 910 m || 
|-id=023 bgcolor=#E9E9E9
| 517023 ||  || — || November 19, 2008 || Kitt Peak || Spacewatch ||  || align=right data-sort-value="0.75" | 750 m || 
|-id=024 bgcolor=#E9E9E9
| 517024 ||  || — || October 6, 2012 || Haleakala || Pan-STARRS ||  || align=right | 1.2 km || 
|-id=025 bgcolor=#E9E9E9
| 517025 ||  || — || December 22, 2008 || Mount Lemmon || Mount Lemmon Survey ||  || align=right | 1.3 km || 
|-id=026 bgcolor=#d6d6d6
| 517026 ||  || — || September 23, 2006 || Kitt Peak || Spacewatch ||  || align=right | 2.5 km || 
|-id=027 bgcolor=#fefefe
| 517027 ||  || — || April 11, 2007 || Kitt Peak || Spacewatch ||  || align=right data-sort-value="0.78" | 780 m || 
|-id=028 bgcolor=#fefefe
| 517028 ||  || — || August 21, 2008 || Kitt Peak || Spacewatch ||  || align=right data-sort-value="0.73" | 730 m || 
|-id=029 bgcolor=#fefefe
| 517029 ||  || — || October 8, 2012 || Mount Lemmon || Mount Lemmon Survey ||  || align=right data-sort-value="0.72" | 720 m || 
|-id=030 bgcolor=#fefefe
| 517030 ||  || — || November 4, 2005 || Kitt Peak || Spacewatch ||  || align=right data-sort-value="0.71" | 710 m || 
|-id=031 bgcolor=#E9E9E9
| 517031 ||  || — || November 14, 2012 || Kitt Peak || Spacewatch ||  || align=right data-sort-value="0.65" | 650 m || 
|-id=032 bgcolor=#E9E9E9
| 517032 ||  || — || October 12, 2007 || Kitt Peak || Spacewatch ||  || align=right | 2.1 km || 
|-id=033 bgcolor=#E9E9E9
| 517033 ||  || — || December 6, 2012 || Mount Lemmon || Mount Lemmon Survey ||  || align=right | 1.9 km || 
|-id=034 bgcolor=#E9E9E9
| 517034 ||  || — || November 22, 2012 || Kitt Peak || Spacewatch ||  || align=right data-sort-value="0.80" | 800 m || 
|-id=035 bgcolor=#FA8072
| 517035 ||  || — || November 13, 2007 || Catalina || CSS ||  || align=right data-sort-value="0.52" | 520 m || 
|-id=036 bgcolor=#fefefe
| 517036 ||  || — || October 9, 2004 || Kitt Peak || Spacewatch || V || align=right data-sort-value="0.69" | 690 m || 
|-id=037 bgcolor=#E9E9E9
| 517037 ||  || — || December 1, 2008 || Mount Lemmon || Mount Lemmon Survey ||  || align=right | 1.3 km || 
|-id=038 bgcolor=#d6d6d6
| 517038 ||  || — || December 22, 2012 || Haleakala || Pan-STARRS ||  || align=right | 3.0 km || 
|-id=039 bgcolor=#E9E9E9
| 517039 ||  || — || January 3, 2013 || Mount Lemmon || Mount Lemmon Survey ||  || align=right | 1.8 km || 
|-id=040 bgcolor=#E9E9E9
| 517040 ||  || — || January 3, 2013 || Mount Lemmon || Mount Lemmon Survey ||  || align=right | 1.9 km || 
|-id=041 bgcolor=#E9E9E9
| 517041 ||  || — || January 3, 2013 || Haleakala || Pan-STARRS ||  || align=right | 1.7 km || 
|-id=042 bgcolor=#E9E9E9
| 517042 ||  || — || March 22, 2009 || Catalina || CSS ||  || align=right | 2.0 km || 
|-id=043 bgcolor=#E9E9E9
| 517043 ||  || — || June 29, 2011 || Kitt Peak || Spacewatch || JUN || align=right | 1.2 km || 
|-id=044 bgcolor=#E9E9E9
| 517044 ||  || — || May 24, 2010 || WISE || WISE ||  || align=right | 3.5 km || 
|-id=045 bgcolor=#E9E9E9
| 517045 ||  || — || January 5, 2013 || Kitt Peak || Spacewatch ||  || align=right | 1.1 km || 
|-id=046 bgcolor=#FFC2E0
| 517046 ||  || — || January 7, 2013 || Haleakala || Pan-STARRS || APO || align=right data-sort-value="0.44" | 440 m || 
|-id=047 bgcolor=#E9E9E9
| 517047 ||  || — || December 29, 2003 || Kitt Peak || Spacewatch ||  || align=right | 1.4 km || 
|-id=048 bgcolor=#E9E9E9
| 517048 ||  || — || January 6, 2013 || Kitt Peak || Spacewatch ||  || align=right | 1.5 km || 
|-id=049 bgcolor=#E9E9E9
| 517049 ||  || — || January 31, 2009 || Mount Lemmon || Mount Lemmon Survey ||  || align=right | 2.0 km || 
|-id=050 bgcolor=#E9E9E9
| 517050 ||  || — || December 23, 2012 || Haleakala || Pan-STARRS ||  || align=right | 1.0 km || 
|-id=051 bgcolor=#E9E9E9
| 517051 ||  || — || December 12, 2012 || Mount Lemmon || Mount Lemmon Survey ||  || align=right | 1.5 km || 
|-id=052 bgcolor=#E9E9E9
| 517052 ||  || — || December 8, 2012 || Mount Lemmon || Mount Lemmon Survey ||  || align=right | 2.5 km || 
|-id=053 bgcolor=#E9E9E9
| 517053 ||  || — || October 26, 2011 || Haleakala || Pan-STARRS ||  || align=right | 2.7 km || 
|-id=054 bgcolor=#E9E9E9
| 517054 ||  || — || March 9, 2005 || Mount Lemmon || Mount Lemmon Survey ||  || align=right | 1.3 km || 
|-id=055 bgcolor=#E9E9E9
| 517055 ||  || — || January 10, 2013 || Haleakala || Pan-STARRS ||  || align=right | 1.2 km || 
|-id=056 bgcolor=#E9E9E9
| 517056 ||  || — || February 9, 1999 || Kitt Peak || Spacewatch ||  || align=right | 2.4 km || 
|-id=057 bgcolor=#E9E9E9
| 517057 ||  || — || January 2, 2009 || Mount Lemmon || Mount Lemmon Survey ||  || align=right | 1.3 km || 
|-id=058 bgcolor=#E9E9E9
| 517058 ||  || — || February 26, 2009 || Kitt Peak || Spacewatch || ADE || align=right | 1.4 km || 
|-id=059 bgcolor=#E9E9E9
| 517059 ||  || — || October 16, 2007 || Kitt Peak || Spacewatch ||  || align=right | 1.1 km || 
|-id=060 bgcolor=#E9E9E9
| 517060 ||  || — || February 1, 2009 || Kitt Peak || Spacewatch ||  || align=right data-sort-value="0.94" | 940 m || 
|-id=061 bgcolor=#E9E9E9
| 517061 ||  || — || April 21, 2009 || Mount Lemmon || Mount Lemmon Survey || MRX || align=right data-sort-value="0.96" | 960 m || 
|-id=062 bgcolor=#E9E9E9
| 517062 ||  || — || January 19, 2013 || Mount Lemmon || Mount Lemmon Survey ||  || align=right | 1.7 km || 
|-id=063 bgcolor=#E9E9E9
| 517063 ||  || — || October 24, 2011 || Haleakala || Pan-STARRS || AEO || align=right | 1.1 km || 
|-id=064 bgcolor=#FA8072
| 517064 ||  || — || October 15, 2012 || Haleakala || Pan-STARRS ||  || align=right | 1.6 km || 
|-id=065 bgcolor=#E9E9E9
| 517065 ||  || — || March 29, 2009 || Catalina || CSS || JUN || align=right data-sort-value="0.94" | 940 m || 
|-id=066 bgcolor=#E9E9E9
| 517066 ||  || — || October 31, 2011 || Mount Lemmon || Mount Lemmon Survey ||  || align=right | 1.6 km || 
|-id=067 bgcolor=#E9E9E9
| 517067 ||  || — || December 16, 2007 || Kitt Peak || Spacewatch ||  || align=right | 1.9 km || 
|-id=068 bgcolor=#E9E9E9
| 517068 ||  || — || December 31, 2007 || Kitt Peak || Spacewatch ||  || align=right | 2.1 km || 
|-id=069 bgcolor=#d6d6d6
| 517069 ||  || — || February 7, 2013 || Catalina || CSS ||  || align=right | 3.1 km || 
|-id=070 bgcolor=#E9E9E9
| 517070 ||  || — || March 26, 2009 || Mount Lemmon || Mount Lemmon Survey || ADE || align=right | 2.0 km || 
|-id=071 bgcolor=#E9E9E9
| 517071 ||  || — || January 19, 2013 || Kitt Peak || Spacewatch || NEM || align=right | 2.3 km || 
|-id=072 bgcolor=#E9E9E9
| 517072 ||  || — || April 7, 2005 || Kitt Peak || Spacewatch ||  || align=right | 1.4 km || 
|-id=073 bgcolor=#E9E9E9
| 517073 ||  || — || February 5, 2013 || Kitt Peak || Spacewatch ||  || align=right | 2.0 km || 
|-id=074 bgcolor=#E9E9E9
| 517074 ||  || — || January 5, 2013 || Kitt Peak || Spacewatch || NEM || align=right | 2.2 km || 
|-id=075 bgcolor=#E9E9E9
| 517075 ||  || — || April 20, 2009 || Kitt Peak || Spacewatch ||  || align=right | 2.1 km || 
|-id=076 bgcolor=#E9E9E9
| 517076 ||  || — || January 19, 2004 || Kitt Peak || Spacewatch ||  || align=right | 1.6 km || 
|-id=077 bgcolor=#E9E9E9
| 517077 ||  || — || February 8, 2013 || Haleakala || Pan-STARRS ||  || align=right | 1.6 km || 
|-id=078 bgcolor=#E9E9E9
| 517078 ||  || — || February 8, 2013 || Haleakala || Pan-STARRS ||  || align=right | 1.2 km || 
|-id=079 bgcolor=#E9E9E9
| 517079 ||  || — || September 24, 2011 || Haleakala || Pan-STARRS ||  || align=right | 1.4 km || 
|-id=080 bgcolor=#E9E9E9
| 517080 ||  || — || February 9, 2013 || Haleakala || Pan-STARRS ||  || align=right | 1.8 km || 
|-id=081 bgcolor=#E9E9E9
| 517081 ||  || — || February 9, 2013 || Haleakala || Pan-STARRS ||  || align=right | 2.1 km || 
|-id=082 bgcolor=#E9E9E9
| 517082 ||  || — || September 26, 2006 || Mount Lemmon || Mount Lemmon Survey ||  || align=right | 2.0 km || 
|-id=083 bgcolor=#E9E9E9
| 517083 ||  || — || April 2, 2009 || Kitt Peak || Spacewatch ||  || align=right | 1.8 km || 
|-id=084 bgcolor=#E9E9E9
| 517084 ||  || — || May 16, 2009 || Kitt Peak || Spacewatch || DOR || align=right | 2.1 km || 
|-id=085 bgcolor=#E9E9E9
| 517085 ||  || — || January 11, 2008 || Mount Lemmon || Mount Lemmon Survey ||  || align=right | 1.9 km || 
|-id=086 bgcolor=#E9E9E9
| 517086 ||  || — || December 23, 2012 || Mount Lemmon || Mount Lemmon Survey ||  || align=right | 2.1 km || 
|-id=087 bgcolor=#E9E9E9
| 517087 ||  || — || October 19, 2011 || Kitt Peak || Spacewatch ||  || align=right | 1.6 km || 
|-id=088 bgcolor=#E9E9E9
| 517088 ||  || — || February 8, 2013 || Kitt Peak || Spacewatch ||  || align=right | 2.3 km || 
|-id=089 bgcolor=#E9E9E9
| 517089 ||  || — || April 25, 2004 || Kitt Peak || Spacewatch ||  || align=right | 1.6 km || 
|-id=090 bgcolor=#E9E9E9
| 517090 ||  || — || February 5, 2013 || Kitt Peak || Spacewatch || AGN || align=right data-sort-value="0.95" | 950 m || 
|-id=091 bgcolor=#E9E9E9
| 517091 ||  || — || October 26, 2011 || Haleakala || Pan-STARRS ||  || align=right | 1.9 km || 
|-id=092 bgcolor=#E9E9E9
| 517092 ||  || — || November 20, 2007 || Mount Lemmon || Mount Lemmon Survey ||  || align=right | 1.9 km || 
|-id=093 bgcolor=#E9E9E9
| 517093 ||  || — || September 4, 2011 || Haleakala || Pan-STARRS ||  || align=right | 2.2 km || 
|-id=094 bgcolor=#E9E9E9
| 517094 ||  || — || September 4, 2010 || Mount Lemmon || Mount Lemmon Survey ||  || align=right | 2.0 km || 
|-id=095 bgcolor=#E9E9E9
| 517095 ||  || — || February 8, 2013 || Haleakala || Pan-STARRS ||  || align=right | 1.7 km || 
|-id=096 bgcolor=#E9E9E9
| 517096 ||  || — || April 12, 2004 || Kitt Peak || Spacewatch ||  || align=right | 2.0 km || 
|-id=097 bgcolor=#E9E9E9
| 517097 ||  || — || October 25, 2011 || Haleakala || Pan-STARRS ||  || align=right | 3.0 km || 
|-id=098 bgcolor=#E9E9E9
| 517098 ||  || — || February 12, 2008 || Mount Lemmon || Mount Lemmon Survey ||  || align=right | 2.2 km || 
|-id=099 bgcolor=#E9E9E9
| 517099 ||  || — || March 21, 2009 || Kitt Peak || Spacewatch ||  || align=right | 1.8 km || 
|-id=100 bgcolor=#E9E9E9
| 517100 ||  || — || March 29, 2004 || Kitt Peak || Spacewatch ||  || align=right | 1.6 km || 
|}

517101–517200 

|-bgcolor=#E9E9E9
| 517101 ||  || — || October 20, 2006 || Kitt Peak || Spacewatch ||  || align=right | 2.1 km || 
|-id=102 bgcolor=#E9E9E9
| 517102 ||  || — || March 5, 2013 || Haleakala || Pan-STARRS ||  || align=right | 2.0 km || 
|-id=103 bgcolor=#FFC2E0
| 517103 ||  || — || January 11, 2008 || Mount Lemmon || Mount Lemmon Survey || APOPHA || align=right data-sort-value="0.37" | 370 m || 
|-id=104 bgcolor=#E9E9E9
| 517104 Redinger ||  ||  || March 8, 2013 || Haleakala || Pan-STARRS ||  || align=right | 1.7 km || 
|-id=105 bgcolor=#d6d6d6
| 517105 ||  || — || March 11, 2013 || Kitt Peak || Spacewatch ||  || align=right | 2.4 km || 
|-id=106 bgcolor=#E9E9E9
| 517106 ||  || — || September 24, 2011 || Haleakala || Pan-STARRS ||  || align=right | 1.4 km || 
|-id=107 bgcolor=#E9E9E9
| 517107 ||  || — || September 23, 2011 || Kitt Peak || Spacewatch ||  || align=right | 1.9 km || 
|-id=108 bgcolor=#E9E9E9
| 517108 ||  || — || March 5, 2013 || Catalina || CSS ||  || align=right | 2.3 km || 
|-id=109 bgcolor=#E9E9E9
| 517109 ||  || — || March 1, 2009 || Kitt Peak || Spacewatch ||  || align=right | 1.6 km || 
|-id=110 bgcolor=#d6d6d6
| 517110 ||  || — || March 31, 2013 || Mount Lemmon || Mount Lemmon Survey ||  || align=right | 1.8 km || 
|-id=111 bgcolor=#d6d6d6
| 517111 ||  || — || March 18, 2013 || Mount Lemmon || Mount Lemmon Survey ||  || align=right | 2.4 km || 
|-id=112 bgcolor=#d6d6d6
| 517112 ||  || — || February 13, 2008 || Mount Lemmon || Mount Lemmon Survey ||  || align=right | 1.8 km || 
|-id=113 bgcolor=#fefefe
| 517113 ||  || — || March 6, 2013 || Haleakala || Pan-STARRS ||  || align=right data-sort-value="0.50" | 500 m || 
|-id=114 bgcolor=#d6d6d6
| 517114 ||  || — || April 8, 2013 || Mount Lemmon || Mount Lemmon Survey ||  || align=right | 2.5 km || 
|-id=115 bgcolor=#d6d6d6
| 517115 ||  || — || October 11, 2010 || Mount Lemmon || Mount Lemmon Survey ||  || align=right | 2.5 km || 
|-id=116 bgcolor=#d6d6d6
| 517116 ||  || — || March 10, 2007 || Kitt Peak || Spacewatch ||  || align=right | 2.5 km || 
|-id=117 bgcolor=#d6d6d6
| 517117 ||  || — || October 7, 2004 || Kitt Peak || Spacewatch ||  || align=right | 2.2 km || 
|-id=118 bgcolor=#d6d6d6
| 517118 ||  || — || March 28, 2008 || Kitt Peak || Spacewatch ||  || align=right | 2.1 km || 
|-id=119 bgcolor=#E9E9E9
| 517119 ||  || — || February 14, 2013 || Haleakala || Pan-STARRS || EUN || align=right | 1.0 km || 
|-id=120 bgcolor=#d6d6d6
| 517120 ||  || — || April 11, 2013 || Kitt Peak || Spacewatch ||  || align=right | 2.4 km || 
|-id=121 bgcolor=#fefefe
| 517121 ||  || — || November 3, 2007 || Kitt Peak || Spacewatch ||  || align=right data-sort-value="0.84" | 840 m || 
|-id=122 bgcolor=#d6d6d6
| 517122 ||  || — || April 10, 2013 || Kitt Peak || Spacewatch ||  || align=right | 2.4 km || 
|-id=123 bgcolor=#d6d6d6
| 517123 ||  || — || September 16, 2009 || Mount Lemmon || Mount Lemmon Survey ||  || align=right | 2.5 km || 
|-id=124 bgcolor=#fefefe
| 517124 ||  || — || April 10, 2013 || Catalina || CSS || H || align=right data-sort-value="0.59" | 590 m || 
|-id=125 bgcolor=#d6d6d6
| 517125 ||  || — || April 4, 2008 || Kitt Peak || Spacewatch ||  || align=right | 2.1 km || 
|-id=126 bgcolor=#d6d6d6
| 517126 ||  || — || October 26, 2011 || Haleakala || Pan-STARRS ||  || align=right | 2.1 km || 
|-id=127 bgcolor=#d6d6d6
| 517127 ||  || — || January 19, 2012 || Mount Lemmon || Mount Lemmon Survey ||  || align=right | 1.8 km || 
|-id=128 bgcolor=#d6d6d6
| 517128 ||  || — || January 18, 2012 || Mount Lemmon || Mount Lemmon Survey ||  || align=right | 1.8 km || 
|-id=129 bgcolor=#d6d6d6
| 517129 ||  || — || April 6, 2013 || Mount Lemmon || Mount Lemmon Survey ||  || align=right | 2.0 km || 
|-id=130 bgcolor=#d6d6d6
| 517130 ||  || — || April 14, 2008 || Kitt Peak || Spacewatch ||  || align=right | 2.0 km || 
|-id=131 bgcolor=#d6d6d6
| 517131 ||  || — || October 1, 2005 || Mount Lemmon || Mount Lemmon Survey ||  || align=right | 1.7 km || 
|-id=132 bgcolor=#d6d6d6
| 517132 ||  || — || September 26, 2005 || Kitt Peak || Spacewatch ||  || align=right | 1.9 km || 
|-id=133 bgcolor=#d6d6d6
| 517133 ||  || — || May 3, 2008 || Mount Lemmon || Mount Lemmon Survey || EOS || align=right | 1.3 km || 
|-id=134 bgcolor=#fefefe
| 517134 ||  || — || April 15, 2013 || Haleakala || Pan-STARRS || H || align=right data-sort-value="0.70" | 700 m || 
|-id=135 bgcolor=#d6d6d6
| 517135 ||  || — || November 3, 2010 || Mount Lemmon || Mount Lemmon Survey ||  || align=right | 2.5 km || 
|-id=136 bgcolor=#d6d6d6
| 517136 ||  || — || April 29, 2008 || Kitt Peak || Spacewatch || EOS || align=right | 1.5 km || 
|-id=137 bgcolor=#d6d6d6
| 517137 ||  || — || January 26, 2010 || WISE || WISE ||  || align=right | 4.3 km || 
|-id=138 bgcolor=#FA8072
| 517138 ||  || — || April 19, 2013 || Mount Lemmon || Mount Lemmon Survey || H || align=right data-sort-value="0.59" | 590 m || 
|-id=139 bgcolor=#fefefe
| 517139 ||  || — || December 15, 2009 || Mount Lemmon || Mount Lemmon Survey || H || align=right data-sort-value="0.64" | 640 m || 
|-id=140 bgcolor=#d6d6d6
| 517140 ||  || — || April 21, 2013 || Mount Lemmon || Mount Lemmon Survey ||  || align=right | 2.5 km || 
|-id=141 bgcolor=#d6d6d6
| 517141 ||  || — || May 2, 2013 || Haleakala || Pan-STARRS ||  || align=right | 3.3 km || 
|-id=142 bgcolor=#fefefe
| 517142 ||  || — || November 23, 2006 || Mount Lemmon || Mount Lemmon Survey || H || align=right data-sort-value="0.59" | 590 m || 
|-id=143 bgcolor=#d6d6d6
| 517143 ||  || — || April 7, 2013 || Kitt Peak || Spacewatch ||  || align=right | 2.9 km || 
|-id=144 bgcolor=#d6d6d6
| 517144 ||  || — || October 21, 2009 || Kitt Peak || Spacewatch ||  || align=right | 2.8 km || 
|-id=145 bgcolor=#d6d6d6
| 517145 ||  || — || April 15, 2013 || Haleakala || Pan-STARRS ||  || align=right | 2.8 km || 
|-id=146 bgcolor=#fefefe
| 517146 ||  || — || June 17, 2005 || Kitt Peak || Spacewatch || H || align=right data-sort-value="0.65" | 650 m || 
|-id=147 bgcolor=#fefefe
| 517147 ||  || — || November 15, 2006 || Catalina || CSS || H || align=right data-sort-value="0.82" | 820 m || 
|-id=148 bgcolor=#d6d6d6
| 517148 ||  || — || March 10, 2007 || Mount Lemmon || Mount Lemmon Survey ||  || align=right | 2.2 km || 
|-id=149 bgcolor=#d6d6d6
| 517149 ||  || — || March 12, 2007 || Kitt Peak || Spacewatch ||  || align=right | 2.8 km || 
|-id=150 bgcolor=#d6d6d6
| 517150 ||  || — || October 14, 2009 || Mount Lemmon || Mount Lemmon Survey ||  || align=right | 2.8 km || 
|-id=151 bgcolor=#d6d6d6
| 517151 ||  || — || November 16, 2009 || Mount Lemmon || Mount Lemmon Survey || TIR || align=right | 2.6 km || 
|-id=152 bgcolor=#d6d6d6
| 517152 ||  || — || April 16, 2013 || Haleakala || Pan-STARRS ||  || align=right | 3.2 km || 
|-id=153 bgcolor=#d6d6d6
| 517153 ||  || — || May 11, 2013 || Mount Lemmon || Mount Lemmon Survey ||  || align=right | 2.6 km || 
|-id=154 bgcolor=#FA8072
| 517154 ||  || — || February 15, 2013 || Haleakala || Pan-STARRS || H || align=right data-sort-value="0.59" | 590 m || 
|-id=155 bgcolor=#d6d6d6
| 517155 ||  || — || May 16, 2013 || Haleakala || Pan-STARRS || THM || align=right | 1.9 km || 
|-id=156 bgcolor=#d6d6d6
| 517156 ||  || — || April 21, 2013 || Mount Lemmon || Mount Lemmon Survey ||  || align=right | 2.3 km || 
|-id=157 bgcolor=#d6d6d6
| 517157 ||  || — || April 15, 2013 || Haleakala || Pan-STARRS ||  || align=right | 2.2 km || 
|-id=158 bgcolor=#fefefe
| 517158 ||  || — || October 17, 2003 || Kitt Peak || Spacewatch || H || align=right data-sort-value="0.62" | 620 m || 
|-id=159 bgcolor=#FA8072
| 517159 ||  || — || June 8, 2013 || Kitt Peak || Spacewatch || H || align=right data-sort-value="0.59" | 590 m || 
|-id=160 bgcolor=#fefefe
| 517160 ||  || — || June 13, 2008 || Kitt Peak || Spacewatch || H || align=right data-sort-value="0.67" | 670 m || 
|-id=161 bgcolor=#d6d6d6
| 517161 ||  || — || February 14, 2013 || Haleakala || Pan-STARRS ||  || align=right | 3.5 km || 
|-id=162 bgcolor=#fefefe
| 517162 ||  || — || June 30, 2013 || Haleakala || Pan-STARRS || H || align=right data-sort-value="0.60" | 600 m || 
|-id=163 bgcolor=#E9E9E9
| 517163 ||  || — || August 26, 2004 || Catalina || CSS ||  || align=right | 1.8 km || 
|-id=164 bgcolor=#d6d6d6
| 517164 ||  || — || July 15, 2013 || Haleakala || Pan-STARRS ||  || align=right | 2.1 km || 
|-id=165 bgcolor=#fefefe
| 517165 ||  || — || August 29, 2006 || Kitt Peak || Spacewatch ||  || align=right data-sort-value="0.64" | 640 m || 
|-id=166 bgcolor=#fefefe
| 517166 ||  || — || October 20, 2007 || Mount Lemmon || Mount Lemmon Survey ||  || align=right data-sort-value="0.62" | 620 m || 
|-id=167 bgcolor=#d6d6d6
| 517167 ||  || — || September 28, 2008 || Mount Lemmon || Mount Lemmon Survey ||  || align=right | 2.1 km || 
|-id=168 bgcolor=#E9E9E9
| 517168 ||  || — || July 16, 2013 || Haleakala || Pan-STARRS ||  || align=right | 2.1 km || 
|-id=169 bgcolor=#d6d6d6
| 517169 ||  || — || November 30, 2008 || Mount Lemmon || Mount Lemmon Survey ||  || align=right | 3.1 km || 
|-id=170 bgcolor=#d6d6d6
| 517170 ||  || — || February 27, 2012 || Haleakala || Pan-STARRS ||  || align=right | 2.4 km || 
|-id=171 bgcolor=#fefefe
| 517171 ||  || — || January 19, 2012 || Haleakala || Pan-STARRS || H || align=right data-sort-value="0.64" | 640 m || 
|-id=172 bgcolor=#d6d6d6
| 517172 ||  || — || November 21, 2009 || Mount Lemmon || Mount Lemmon Survey ||  || align=right | 2.8 km || 
|-id=173 bgcolor=#d6d6d6
| 517173 ||  || — || October 20, 2008 || Mount Lemmon || Mount Lemmon Survey ||  || align=right | 2.3 km || 
|-id=174 bgcolor=#E9E9E9
| 517174 ||  || — || August 3, 1999 || Kitt Peak || Spacewatch ||  || align=right | 1.8 km || 
|-id=175 bgcolor=#E9E9E9
| 517175 ||  || — || January 30, 2011 || Haleakala || Pan-STARRS ||  || align=right | 2.1 km || 
|-id=176 bgcolor=#d6d6d6
| 517176 ||  || — || September 28, 2008 || Mount Lemmon || Mount Lemmon Survey ||  || align=right | 2.6 km || 
|-id=177 bgcolor=#d6d6d6
| 517177 ||  || — || October 10, 2008 || Mount Lemmon || Mount Lemmon Survey ||  || align=right | 2.4 km || 
|-id=178 bgcolor=#d6d6d6
| 517178 ||  || — || August 27, 2013 || Haleakala || Pan-STARRS ||  || align=right | 3.0 km || 
|-id=179 bgcolor=#FA8072
| 517179 ||  || — || March 16, 2004 || Socorro || LINEAR ||  || align=right | 1.1 km || 
|-id=180 bgcolor=#d6d6d6
| 517180 ||  || — || August 7, 2008 || Kitt Peak || Spacewatch ||  || align=right | 1.8 km || 
|-id=181 bgcolor=#d6d6d6
| 517181 ||  || — || August 7, 2008 || Kitt Peak || Spacewatch ||  || align=right | 1.8 km || 
|-id=182 bgcolor=#d6d6d6
| 517182 ||  || — || November 1, 2008 || Mount Lemmon || Mount Lemmon Survey ||  || align=right | 2.5 km || 
|-id=183 bgcolor=#d6d6d6
| 517183 ||  || — || September 23, 2008 || Mount Lemmon || Mount Lemmon Survey ||  || align=right | 3.1 km || 
|-id=184 bgcolor=#d6d6d6
| 517184 ||  || — || January 30, 2011 || Haleakala || Pan-STARRS ||  || align=right | 2.2 km || 
|-id=185 bgcolor=#d6d6d6
| 517185 ||  || — || September 13, 2013 || Mount Lemmon || Mount Lemmon Survey ||  || align=right | 2.9 km || 
|-id=186 bgcolor=#d6d6d6
| 517186 ||  || — || September 13, 2013 || Kitt Peak || Spacewatch ||  || align=right | 3.5 km || 
|-id=187 bgcolor=#E9E9E9
| 517187 ||  || — || January 8, 2010 || Kitt Peak || Spacewatch ||  || align=right | 1.9 km || 
|-id=188 bgcolor=#E9E9E9
| 517188 ||  || — || September 14, 2013 || Mount Lemmon || Mount Lemmon Survey ||  || align=right | 1.9 km || 
|-id=189 bgcolor=#E9E9E9
| 517189 ||  || — || August 5, 2008 || Siding Spring || SSS ||  || align=right | 2.3 km || 
|-id=190 bgcolor=#d6d6d6
| 517190 ||  || — || October 3, 2013 || Haleakala || Pan-STARRS ||  || align=right | 2.5 km || 
|-id=191 bgcolor=#d6d6d6
| 517191 ||  || — || October 1, 2013 || Kitt Peak || Spacewatch ||  || align=right | 1.8 km || 
|-id=192 bgcolor=#E9E9E9
| 517192 ||  || — || October 9, 2008 || Catalina || CSS ||  || align=right | 1.6 km || 
|-id=193 bgcolor=#E9E9E9
| 517193 ||  || — || April 3, 2011 || Haleakala || Pan-STARRS ||  || align=right | 1.7 km || 
|-id=194 bgcolor=#d6d6d6
| 517194 ||  || — || April 3, 2011 || Haleakala || Pan-STARRS ||  || align=right | 2.4 km || 
|-id=195 bgcolor=#d6d6d6
| 517195 ||  || — || October 24, 2013 || Mount Lemmon || Mount Lemmon Survey ||  || align=right | 2.1 km || 
|-id=196 bgcolor=#d6d6d6
| 517196 ||  || — || December 1, 2008 || Mount Lemmon || Mount Lemmon Survey ||  || align=right | 3.0 km || 
|-id=197 bgcolor=#d6d6d6
| 517197 ||  || — || October 25, 2013 || Catalina || CSS ||  || align=right | 4.1 km || 
|-id=198 bgcolor=#d6d6d6
| 517198 ||  || — || December 21, 2008 || Catalina || CSS ||  || align=right | 3.3 km || 
|-id=199 bgcolor=#E9E9E9
| 517199 ||  || — || September 24, 2008 || Mount Lemmon || Mount Lemmon Survey ||  || align=right | 1.8 km || 
|-id=200 bgcolor=#E9E9E9
| 517200 ||  || — || November 4, 2013 || Kitt Peak || Spacewatch ||  || align=right | 1.7 km || 
|}

517201–517300 

|-bgcolor=#E9E9E9
| 517201 ||  || — || November 6, 2013 || Mount Lemmon || Mount Lemmon Survey ||  || align=right | 2.2 km || 
|-id=202 bgcolor=#E9E9E9
| 517202 ||  || — || August 17, 2012 || Haleakala || Pan-STARRS ||  || align=right | 2.2 km || 
|-id=203 bgcolor=#d6d6d6
| 517203 ||  || — || November 9, 2013 || Haleakala || Pan-STARRS ||  || align=right | 1.8 km || 
|-id=204 bgcolor=#E9E9E9
| 517204 ||  || — || September 7, 2008 || Mount Lemmon || Mount Lemmon Survey ||  || align=right | 1.6 km || 
|-id=205 bgcolor=#fefefe
| 517205 ||  || — || April 24, 2008 || Mount Lemmon || Mount Lemmon Survey ||  || align=right data-sort-value="0.85" | 850 m || 
|-id=206 bgcolor=#E9E9E9
| 517206 ||  || — || December 7, 2013 || Kitt Peak || Spacewatch ||  || align=right | 1.2 km || 
|-id=207 bgcolor=#fefefe
| 517207 ||  || — || January 10, 2007 || Mount Lemmon || Mount Lemmon Survey ||  || align=right data-sort-value="0.72" | 720 m || 
|-id=208 bgcolor=#fefefe
| 517208 ||  || — || December 11, 2013 || Catalina || CSS ||  || align=right data-sort-value="0.84" | 840 m || 
|-id=209 bgcolor=#fefefe
| 517209 ||  || — || December 13, 2013 || Mount Lemmon || Mount Lemmon Survey || NYS || align=right data-sort-value="0.58" | 580 m || 
|-id=210 bgcolor=#fefefe
| 517210 ||  || — || December 30, 2013 || Kitt Peak || Spacewatch ||  || align=right data-sort-value="0.65" | 650 m || 
|-id=211 bgcolor=#fefefe
| 517211 ||  || — || December 13, 2006 || Mount Lemmon || Mount Lemmon Survey ||  || align=right data-sort-value="0.71" | 710 m || 
|-id=212 bgcolor=#fefefe
| 517212 ||  || — || November 27, 2009 || Mount Lemmon || Mount Lemmon Survey ||  || align=right data-sort-value="0.93" | 930 m || 
|-id=213 bgcolor=#E9E9E9
| 517213 ||  || — || December 24, 2013 || Mount Lemmon || Mount Lemmon Survey ||  || align=right | 1.1 km || 
|-id=214 bgcolor=#E9E9E9
| 517214 ||  || — || December 25, 2013 || Mount Lemmon || Mount Lemmon Survey ||  || align=right | 1.8 km || 
|-id=215 bgcolor=#E9E9E9
| 517215 ||  || — || December 25, 2013 || Mount Lemmon || Mount Lemmon Survey ||  || align=right | 1.8 km || 
|-id=216 bgcolor=#fefefe
| 517216 ||  || — || January 28, 2007 || Kitt Peak || Spacewatch ||  || align=right data-sort-value="0.68" | 680 m || 
|-id=217 bgcolor=#E9E9E9
| 517217 ||  || — || January 1, 2014 || Haleakala || Pan-STARRS ||  || align=right | 1.00 km || 
|-id=218 bgcolor=#E9E9E9
| 517218 ||  || — || February 17, 2010 || Mount Lemmon || Mount Lemmon Survey ||  || align=right data-sort-value="0.82" | 820 m || 
|-id=219 bgcolor=#E9E9E9
| 517219 ||  || — || January 5, 2014 || Haleakala || Pan-STARRS ||  || align=right | 1.6 km || 
|-id=220 bgcolor=#fefefe
| 517220 ||  || — || December 25, 2013 || Mount Lemmon || Mount Lemmon Survey ||  || align=right data-sort-value="0.74" | 740 m || 
|-id=221 bgcolor=#fefefe
| 517221 ||  || — || December 31, 2002 || Socorro || LINEAR ||  || align=right data-sort-value="0.89" | 890 m || 
|-id=222 bgcolor=#fefefe
| 517222 ||  || — || March 13, 2011 || Mount Lemmon || Mount Lemmon Survey ||  || align=right data-sort-value="0.55" | 550 m || 
|-id=223 bgcolor=#fefefe
| 517223 ||  || — || April 2, 2011 || Kitt Peak || Spacewatch ||  || align=right data-sort-value="0.82" | 820 m || 
|-id=224 bgcolor=#fefefe
| 517224 ||  || — || February 26, 2007 || Mount Lemmon || Mount Lemmon Survey || NYS || align=right data-sort-value="0.55" | 550 m || 
|-id=225 bgcolor=#fefefe
| 517225 ||  || — || December 20, 2006 || Mount Lemmon || Mount Lemmon Survey ||  || align=right data-sort-value="0.77" | 770 m || 
|-id=226 bgcolor=#fefefe
| 517226 ||  || — || November 24, 2009 || Kitt Peak || Spacewatch || NYS || align=right data-sort-value="0.53" | 530 m || 
|-id=227 bgcolor=#E9E9E9
| 517227 ||  || — || January 21, 2014 || Kitt Peak || Spacewatch ||  || align=right data-sort-value="0.91" | 910 m || 
|-id=228 bgcolor=#fefefe
| 517228 ||  || — || January 7, 2014 || Mount Lemmon || Mount Lemmon Survey ||  || align=right data-sort-value="0.65" | 650 m || 
|-id=229 bgcolor=#fefefe
| 517229 ||  || — || March 25, 2007 || Mount Lemmon || Mount Lemmon Survey || MAS || align=right data-sort-value="0.65" | 650 m || 
|-id=230 bgcolor=#d6d6d6
| 517230 ||  || — || December 30, 2013 || Mount Lemmon || Mount Lemmon Survey ||  || align=right | 2.7 km || 
|-id=231 bgcolor=#fefefe
| 517231 ||  || — || October 23, 2009 || Mount Lemmon || Mount Lemmon Survey ||  || align=right data-sort-value="0.70" | 700 m || 
|-id=232 bgcolor=#E9E9E9
| 517232 ||  || — || October 28, 2008 || Mount Lemmon || Mount Lemmon Survey ||  || align=right | 1.2 km || 
|-id=233 bgcolor=#E9E9E9
| 517233 ||  || — || November 2, 2008 || Catalina || CSS ||  || align=right | 1.9 km || 
|-id=234 bgcolor=#fefefe
| 517234 ||  || — || November 25, 2005 || Mount Lemmon || Mount Lemmon Survey ||  || align=right data-sort-value="0.68" | 680 m || 
|-id=235 bgcolor=#E9E9E9
| 517235 ||  || — || December 14, 2013 || Mount Lemmon || Mount Lemmon Survey ||  || align=right data-sort-value="0.91" | 910 m || 
|-id=236 bgcolor=#fefefe
| 517236 ||  || — || January 6, 2010 || Kitt Peak || Spacewatch ||  || align=right data-sort-value="0.80" | 800 m || 
|-id=237 bgcolor=#E9E9E9
| 517237 ||  || — || December 31, 2008 || Mount Lemmon || Mount Lemmon Survey ||  || align=right | 2.5 km || 
|-id=238 bgcolor=#fefefe
| 517238 ||  || — || October 10, 2008 || Mount Lemmon || Mount Lemmon Survey ||  || align=right data-sort-value="0.98" | 980 m || 
|-id=239 bgcolor=#fefefe
| 517239 ||  || — || March 24, 2003 || Kitt Peak || Spacewatch || MAS || align=right data-sort-value="0.61" | 610 m || 
|-id=240 bgcolor=#fefefe
| 517240 ||  || — || November 24, 2009 || Kitt Peak || Spacewatch ||  || align=right data-sort-value="0.65" | 650 m || 
|-id=241 bgcolor=#fefefe
| 517241 ||  || — || February 20, 2014 || Kitt Peak || Spacewatch ||  || align=right data-sort-value="0.68" | 680 m || 
|-id=242 bgcolor=#fefefe
| 517242 ||  || — || December 1, 2005 || Kitt Peak || Spacewatch || NYS || align=right data-sort-value="0.56" | 560 m || 
|-id=243 bgcolor=#fefefe
| 517243 ||  || — || April 14, 2007 || Kitt Peak || Spacewatch ||  || align=right data-sort-value="0.77" | 770 m || 
|-id=244 bgcolor=#fefefe
| 517244 ||  || — || December 18, 2009 || Kitt Peak || Spacewatch ||  || align=right data-sort-value="0.57" | 570 m || 
|-id=245 bgcolor=#fefefe
| 517245 ||  || — || March 13, 2007 || Mount Lemmon || Mount Lemmon Survey || NYS || align=right data-sort-value="0.48" | 480 m || 
|-id=246 bgcolor=#fefefe
| 517246 ||  || — || April 29, 2003 || Kitt Peak || Spacewatch || NYS || align=right data-sort-value="0.66" | 660 m || 
|-id=247 bgcolor=#fefefe
| 517247 ||  || — || April 4, 2010 || WISE || WISE ||  || align=right | 1.7 km || 
|-id=248 bgcolor=#fefefe
| 517248 ||  || — || January 6, 2010 || Kitt Peak || Spacewatch ||  || align=right data-sort-value="0.71" | 710 m || 
|-id=249 bgcolor=#fefefe
| 517249 ||  || — || October 30, 2005 || Mount Lemmon || Mount Lemmon Survey || MAS || align=right data-sort-value="0.54" | 540 m || 
|-id=250 bgcolor=#fefefe
| 517250 ||  || — || February 17, 2010 || Mount Lemmon || Mount Lemmon Survey ||  || align=right data-sort-value="0.71" | 710 m || 
|-id=251 bgcolor=#fefefe
| 517251 ||  || — || July 22, 2011 || Haleakala || Pan-STARRS || MAS || align=right data-sort-value="0.77" | 770 m || 
|-id=252 bgcolor=#fefefe
| 517252 ||  || — || October 7, 2012 || Haleakala || Pan-STARRS ||  || align=right data-sort-value="0.86" | 860 m || 
|-id=253 bgcolor=#fefefe
| 517253 ||  || — || October 25, 2008 || Mount Lemmon || Mount Lemmon Survey ||  || align=right data-sort-value="0.95" | 950 m || 
|-id=254 bgcolor=#fefefe
| 517254 ||  || — || February 26, 2014 || Haleakala || Pan-STARRS ||  || align=right data-sort-value="0.72" | 720 m || 
|-id=255 bgcolor=#fefefe
| 517255 ||  || — || January 29, 2014 || Kitt Peak || Spacewatch || MAS || align=right data-sort-value="0.56" | 560 m || 
|-id=256 bgcolor=#fefefe
| 517256 ||  || — || February 23, 2007 || Mount Lemmon || Mount Lemmon Survey ||  || align=right | 2.7 km || 
|-id=257 bgcolor=#fefefe
| 517257 ||  || — || January 17, 2010 || Kitt Peak || Spacewatch || NYS || align=right data-sort-value="0.59" | 590 m || 
|-id=258 bgcolor=#fefefe
| 517258 ||  || — || February 9, 2014 || Haleakala || Pan-STARRS || NYS || align=right data-sort-value="0.56" | 560 m || 
|-id=259 bgcolor=#E9E9E9
| 517259 ||  || — || February 27, 2006 || Kitt Peak || Spacewatch ||  || align=right data-sort-value="0.72" | 720 m || 
|-id=260 bgcolor=#fefefe
| 517260 ||  || — || July 26, 2011 || Haleakala || Pan-STARRS || NYS || align=right data-sort-value="0.77" | 770 m || 
|-id=261 bgcolor=#fefefe
| 517261 ||  || — || February 7, 2006 || Kitt Peak || Spacewatch ||  || align=right data-sort-value="0.78" | 780 m || 
|-id=262 bgcolor=#E9E9E9
| 517262 ||  || — || February 26, 2014 || Haleakala || Pan-STARRS ||  || align=right data-sort-value="0.90" | 900 m || 
|-id=263 bgcolor=#fefefe
| 517263 ||  || — || February 11, 2014 || Mount Lemmon || Mount Lemmon Survey ||  || align=right | 1.9 km || 
|-id=264 bgcolor=#fefefe
| 517264 ||  || — || February 28, 2014 || Haleakala || Pan-STARRS ||  || align=right data-sort-value="0.78" | 780 m || 
|-id=265 bgcolor=#fefefe
| 517265 ||  || — || March 14, 2007 || Mount Lemmon || Mount Lemmon Survey ||  || align=right data-sort-value="0.78" | 780 m || 
|-id=266 bgcolor=#fefefe
| 517266 ||  || — || February 26, 2014 || Haleakala || Pan-STARRS ||  || align=right data-sort-value="0.75" | 750 m || 
|-id=267 bgcolor=#fefefe
| 517267 ||  || — || January 26, 2014 || Haleakala || Pan-STARRS ||  || align=right data-sort-value="0.79" | 790 m || 
|-id=268 bgcolor=#fefefe
| 517268 ||  || — || January 2, 2006 || Mount Lemmon || Mount Lemmon Survey ||  || align=right data-sort-value="0.82" | 820 m || 
|-id=269 bgcolor=#fefefe
| 517269 ||  || — || February 28, 2014 || Haleakala || Pan-STARRS ||  || align=right data-sort-value="0.87" | 870 m || 
|-id=270 bgcolor=#fefefe
| 517270 ||  || — || October 11, 2012 || Haleakala || Pan-STARRS || V || align=right data-sort-value="0.75" | 750 m || 
|-id=271 bgcolor=#fefefe
| 517271 ||  || — || March 20, 2014 || Haleakala || Pan-STARRS || H || align=right data-sort-value="0.88" | 880 m || 
|-id=272 bgcolor=#d6d6d6
| 517272 ||  || — || March 6, 2008 || Catalina || CSS ||  || align=right | 3.9 km || 
|-id=273 bgcolor=#E9E9E9
| 517273 ||  || — || May 23, 2006 || Mount Lemmon || Mount Lemmon Survey ||  || align=right data-sort-value="0.94" | 940 m || 
|-id=274 bgcolor=#d6d6d6
| 517274 ||  || — || September 4, 2011 || Haleakala || Pan-STARRS ||  || align=right | 2.7 km || 
|-id=275 bgcolor=#E9E9E9
| 517275 ||  || — || October 18, 2012 || Haleakala || Pan-STARRS ||  || align=right | 1.3 km || 
|-id=276 bgcolor=#d6d6d6
| 517276 ||  || — || December 9, 2012 || Haleakala || Pan-STARRS ||  || align=right | 2.9 km || 
|-id=277 bgcolor=#E9E9E9
| 517277 ||  || — || November 1, 2008 || Mount Lemmon || Mount Lemmon Survey ||  || align=right | 1.3 km || 
|-id=278 bgcolor=#E9E9E9
| 517278 ||  || — || May 11, 2010 || Mount Lemmon || Mount Lemmon Survey ||  || align=right data-sort-value="0.97" | 970 m || 
|-id=279 bgcolor=#E9E9E9
| 517279 ||  || — || April 4, 2014 || Kitt Peak || Spacewatch ||  || align=right data-sort-value="0.78" | 780 m || 
|-id=280 bgcolor=#E9E9E9
| 517280 ||  || — || March 23, 2014 || Kitt Peak || Spacewatch ||  || align=right | 1.0 km || 
|-id=281 bgcolor=#E9E9E9
| 517281 ||  || — || March 25, 2014 || Kitt Peak || Spacewatch ||  || align=right data-sort-value="0.86" | 860 m || 
|-id=282 bgcolor=#fefefe
| 517282 ||  || — || March 9, 2014 || Haleakala || Pan-STARRS ||  || align=right data-sort-value="0.94" | 940 m || 
|-id=283 bgcolor=#E9E9E9
| 517283 ||  || — || April 11, 2005 || Mount Lemmon || Mount Lemmon Survey ||  || align=right | 1.3 km || 
|-id=284 bgcolor=#E9E9E9
| 517284 ||  || — || March 25, 2014 || Mount Lemmon || Mount Lemmon Survey ||  || align=right data-sort-value="0.91" | 910 m || 
|-id=285 bgcolor=#E9E9E9
| 517285 ||  || — || February 4, 2009 || Mount Lemmon || Mount Lemmon Survey ||  || align=right | 1.3 km || 
|-id=286 bgcolor=#E9E9E9
| 517286 ||  || — || November 15, 2003 || Kitt Peak || Spacewatch ||  || align=right data-sort-value="0.91" | 910 m || 
|-id=287 bgcolor=#E9E9E9
| 517287 ||  || — || April 5, 2014 || Haleakala || Pan-STARRS ||  || align=right data-sort-value="0.94" | 940 m || 
|-id=288 bgcolor=#E9E9E9
| 517288 ||  || — || March 21, 2014 || Kitt Peak || Spacewatch ||  || align=right data-sort-value="0.98" | 980 m || 
|-id=289 bgcolor=#E9E9E9
| 517289 ||  || — || September 24, 2011 || Haleakala || Pan-STARRS ||  || align=right | 1.4 km || 
|-id=290 bgcolor=#E9E9E9
| 517290 ||  || — || December 6, 2012 || Mount Lemmon || Mount Lemmon Survey ||  || align=right data-sort-value="0.91" | 910 m || 
|-id=291 bgcolor=#E9E9E9
| 517291 ||  || — || September 26, 2011 || Haleakala || Pan-STARRS ||  || align=right data-sort-value="0.90" | 900 m || 
|-id=292 bgcolor=#E9E9E9
| 517292 ||  || — || April 4, 2010 || Kitt Peak || Spacewatch ||  || align=right data-sort-value="0.82" | 820 m || 
|-id=293 bgcolor=#E9E9E9
| 517293 ||  || — || November 12, 2012 || Mount Lemmon || Mount Lemmon Survey || BRG || align=right | 1.2 km || 
|-id=294 bgcolor=#E9E9E9
| 517294 ||  || — || April 24, 2006 || Kitt Peak || Spacewatch ||  || align=right data-sort-value="0.71" | 710 m || 
|-id=295 bgcolor=#E9E9E9
| 517295 ||  || — || March 27, 2014 || Haleakala || Pan-STARRS ||  || align=right data-sort-value="0.71" | 710 m || 
|-id=296 bgcolor=#E9E9E9
| 517296 ||  || — || October 27, 2008 || Mount Lemmon || Mount Lemmon Survey ||  || align=right data-sort-value="0.73" | 730 m || 
|-id=297 bgcolor=#E9E9E9
| 517297 ||  || — || December 4, 2008 || Kitt Peak || Spacewatch ||  || align=right data-sort-value="0.82" | 820 m || 
|-id=298 bgcolor=#E9E9E9
| 517298 ||  || — || October 10, 2007 || Mount Lemmon || Mount Lemmon Survey ||  || align=right | 1.7 km || 
|-id=299 bgcolor=#E9E9E9
| 517299 ||  || — || October 28, 2008 || Mount Lemmon || Mount Lemmon Survey ||  || align=right data-sort-value="0.71" | 710 m || 
|-id=300 bgcolor=#E9E9E9
| 517300 ||  || — || October 21, 2012 || Haleakala || Pan-STARRS ||  || align=right data-sort-value="0.78" | 780 m || 
|}

517301–517400 

|-bgcolor=#E9E9E9
| 517301 ||  || — || September 26, 2011 || Haleakala || Pan-STARRS ||  || align=right data-sort-value="0.78" | 780 m || 
|-id=302 bgcolor=#E9E9E9
| 517302 ||  || — || April 5, 2014 || Haleakala || Pan-STARRS ||  || align=right data-sort-value="0.75" | 750 m || 
|-id=303 bgcolor=#E9E9E9
| 517303 ||  || — || April 4, 2014 || Haleakala || Pan-STARRS ||  || align=right | 1.7 km || 
|-id=304 bgcolor=#E9E9E9
| 517304 ||  || — || January 17, 2013 || Haleakala || Pan-STARRS ||  || align=right | 1.4 km || 
|-id=305 bgcolor=#d6d6d6
| 517305 ||  || — || April 5, 2014 || Haleakala || Pan-STARRS ||  || align=right | 3.0 km || 
|-id=306 bgcolor=#E9E9E9
| 517306 ||  || — || December 4, 2008 || Mount Lemmon || Mount Lemmon Survey ||  || align=right | 1.2 km || 
|-id=307 bgcolor=#fefefe
| 517307 ||  || — || February 15, 2010 || Mount Lemmon || Mount Lemmon Survey ||  || align=right data-sort-value="0.71" | 710 m || 
|-id=308 bgcolor=#E9E9E9
| 517308 ||  || — || February 28, 2014 || Haleakala || Pan-STARRS ||  || align=right | 1.2 km || 
|-id=309 bgcolor=#E9E9E9
| 517309 ||  || — || April 20, 2014 || Mount Lemmon || Mount Lemmon Survey || MIS || align=right | 2.1 km || 
|-id=310 bgcolor=#E9E9E9
| 517310 ||  || — || February 9, 2005 || Kitt Peak || Spacewatch ||  || align=right | 1.1 km || 
|-id=311 bgcolor=#E9E9E9
| 517311 ||  || — || January 3, 2009 || Mount Lemmon || Mount Lemmon Survey ||  || align=right data-sort-value="0.89" | 890 m || 
|-id=312 bgcolor=#E9E9E9
| 517312 ||  || — || March 17, 2005 || Mount Lemmon || Mount Lemmon Survey ||  || align=right | 1.0 km || 
|-id=313 bgcolor=#E9E9E9
| 517313 ||  || — || April 30, 2014 || Haleakala || Pan-STARRS ||  || align=right data-sort-value="0.97" | 970 m || 
|-id=314 bgcolor=#E9E9E9
| 517314 ||  || — || October 8, 2007 || Mount Lemmon || Mount Lemmon Survey ||  || align=right | 1.4 km || 
|-id=315 bgcolor=#E9E9E9
| 517315 ||  || — || April 30, 2014 || Haleakala || Pan-STARRS ||  || align=right | 1.9 km || 
|-id=316 bgcolor=#E9E9E9
| 517316 ||  || — || May 3, 2014 || Mount Lemmon || Mount Lemmon Survey ||  || align=right | 1.3 km || 
|-id=317 bgcolor=#E9E9E9
| 517317 ||  || — || February 28, 2014 || Haleakala || Pan-STARRS ||  || align=right | 1.1 km || 
|-id=318 bgcolor=#E9E9E9
| 517318 ||  || — || October 21, 2011 || Mount Lemmon || Mount Lemmon Survey ||  || align=right | 1.3 km || 
|-id=319 bgcolor=#E9E9E9
| 517319 ||  || — || March 28, 2014 || Haleakala || Pan-STARRS ||  || align=right | 1.5 km || 
|-id=320 bgcolor=#E9E9E9
| 517320 ||  || — || May 3, 2014 || Mount Lemmon || Mount Lemmon Survey ||  || align=right | 1.00 km || 
|-id=321 bgcolor=#E9E9E9
| 517321 ||  || — || November 12, 2007 || Mount Lemmon || Mount Lemmon Survey ||  || align=right data-sort-value="0.86" | 860 m || 
|-id=322 bgcolor=#fefefe
| 517322 ||  || — || April 14, 2010 || Mount Lemmon || Mount Lemmon Survey ||  || align=right | 1.1 km || 
|-id=323 bgcolor=#E9E9E9
| 517323 ||  || — || May 2, 2014 || Mount Lemmon || Mount Lemmon Survey ||  || align=right | 1.1 km || 
|-id=324 bgcolor=#E9E9E9
| 517324 ||  || — || April 10, 2010 || WISE || WISE || ADE || align=right | 2.3 km || 
|-id=325 bgcolor=#E9E9E9
| 517325 ||  || — || September 2, 2011 || Haleakala || Pan-STARRS ||  || align=right data-sort-value="0.79" | 790 m || 
|-id=326 bgcolor=#d6d6d6
| 517326 ||  || — || April 4, 2014 || Haleakala || Pan-STARRS ||  || align=right | 3.3 km || 
|-id=327 bgcolor=#E9E9E9
| 517327 ||  || — || September 20, 1998 || Kitt Peak || Spacewatch ||  || align=right data-sort-value="0.93" | 930 m || 
|-id=328 bgcolor=#E9E9E9
| 517328 ||  || — || February 28, 2014 || Haleakala || Pan-STARRS ||  || align=right data-sort-value="0.98" | 980 m || 
|-id=329 bgcolor=#E9E9E9
| 517329 ||  || — || September 20, 2011 || Mount Lemmon || Mount Lemmon Survey ||  || align=right data-sort-value="0.83" | 830 m || 
|-id=330 bgcolor=#E9E9E9
| 517330 ||  || — || May 5, 2014 || Haleakala || Pan-STARRS ||  || align=right data-sort-value="0.86" | 860 m || 
|-id=331 bgcolor=#E9E9E9
| 517331 ||  || — || April 27, 2010 || WISE || WISE ||  || align=right | 1.5 km || 
|-id=332 bgcolor=#E9E9E9
| 517332 ||  || — || November 9, 2007 || Kitt Peak || Spacewatch ||  || align=right | 2.1 km || 
|-id=333 bgcolor=#E9E9E9
| 517333 ||  || — || April 12, 2010 || Mount Lemmon || Mount Lemmon Survey || EUN || align=right | 1.1 km || 
|-id=334 bgcolor=#E9E9E9
| 517334 ||  || — || February 4, 2009 || Mount Lemmon || Mount Lemmon Survey ||  || align=right | 1.1 km || 
|-id=335 bgcolor=#E9E9E9
| 517335 ||  || — || February 20, 2009 || Kitt Peak || Spacewatch ||  || align=right | 1.0 km || 
|-id=336 bgcolor=#E9E9E9
| 517336 ||  || — || May 4, 2014 || Haleakala || Pan-STARRS ||  || align=right | 1.4 km || 
|-id=337 bgcolor=#E9E9E9
| 517337 ||  || — || October 25, 2011 || Haleakala || Pan-STARRS || EUN || align=right | 1.2 km || 
|-id=338 bgcolor=#E9E9E9
| 517338 ||  || — || February 19, 2009 || Kitt Peak || Spacewatch ||  || align=right | 2.1 km || 
|-id=339 bgcolor=#E9E9E9
| 517339 ||  || — || October 20, 2007 || Mount Lemmon || Mount Lemmon Survey ||  || align=right | 1.6 km || 
|-id=340 bgcolor=#E9E9E9
| 517340 ||  || — || May 4, 2010 || Kitt Peak || Spacewatch ||  || align=right data-sort-value="0.98" | 980 m || 
|-id=341 bgcolor=#E9E9E9
| 517341 ||  || — || January 17, 2013 || Haleakala || Pan-STARRS ||  || align=right data-sort-value="0.90" | 900 m || 
|-id=342 bgcolor=#E9E9E9
| 517342 ||  || — || May 7, 2010 || Mount Lemmon || Mount Lemmon Survey ||  || align=right data-sort-value="0.86" | 860 m || 
|-id=343 bgcolor=#E9E9E9
| 517343 ||  || — || December 22, 2008 || Kitt Peak || Spacewatch ||  || align=right data-sort-value="0.91" | 910 m || 
|-id=344 bgcolor=#E9E9E9
| 517344 ||  || — || April 12, 2005 || Mount Lemmon || Mount Lemmon Survey ||  || align=right | 1.4 km || 
|-id=345 bgcolor=#E9E9E9
| 517345 ||  || — || December 23, 2012 || Haleakala || Pan-STARRS ||  || align=right | 1.3 km || 
|-id=346 bgcolor=#E9E9E9
| 517346 ||  || — || December 22, 2012 || Haleakala || Pan-STARRS || MAR || align=right data-sort-value="0.92" | 920 m || 
|-id=347 bgcolor=#E9E9E9
| 517347 ||  || — || December 22, 2012 || Haleakala || Pan-STARRS ||  || align=right | 1.4 km || 
|-id=348 bgcolor=#E9E9E9
| 517348 ||  || — || April 30, 2014 || Haleakala || Pan-STARRS ||  || align=right | 1.4 km || 
|-id=349 bgcolor=#E9E9E9
| 517349 ||  || — || October 4, 2006 || Mount Lemmon || Mount Lemmon Survey ||  || align=right | 1.5 km || 
|-id=350 bgcolor=#E9E9E9
| 517350 ||  || — || April 22, 2014 || Kitt Peak || Spacewatch ||  || align=right | 1.2 km || 
|-id=351 bgcolor=#E9E9E9
| 517351 ||  || — || January 19, 2013 || Kitt Peak || Spacewatch ||  || align=right | 1.8 km || 
|-id=352 bgcolor=#E9E9E9
| 517352 ||  || — || May 10, 2014 || Haleakala || Pan-STARRS ||  || align=right | 1.2 km || 
|-id=353 bgcolor=#E9E9E9
| 517353 ||  || — || May 8, 2014 || Haleakala || Pan-STARRS ||  || align=right | 1.5 km || 
|-id=354 bgcolor=#E9E9E9
| 517354 ||  || — || November 2, 2007 || Mount Lemmon || Mount Lemmon Survey ||  || align=right | 1.4 km || 
|-id=355 bgcolor=#E9E9E9
| 517355 ||  || — || October 10, 2007 || Mount Lemmon || Mount Lemmon Survey ||  || align=right | 1.5 km || 
|-id=356 bgcolor=#E9E9E9
| 517356 ||  || — || January 3, 2013 || Haleakala || Pan-STARRS ||  || align=right | 1.5 km || 
|-id=357 bgcolor=#E9E9E9
| 517357 ||  || — || September 4, 2011 || Haleakala || Pan-STARRS ||  || align=right | 2.3 km || 
|-id=358 bgcolor=#E9E9E9
| 517358 ||  || — || February 4, 2009 || Catalina || CSS ||  || align=right | 1.2 km || 
|-id=359 bgcolor=#E9E9E9
| 517359 ||  || — || December 31, 2008 || Kitt Peak || Spacewatch ||  || align=right | 1.3 km || 
|-id=360 bgcolor=#E9E9E9
| 517360 ||  || — || September 26, 2011 || Haleakala || Pan-STARRS ||  || align=right | 1.2 km || 
|-id=361 bgcolor=#E9E9E9
| 517361 ||  || — || March 3, 2009 || Mount Lemmon || Mount Lemmon Survey ||  || align=right | 1.4 km || 
|-id=362 bgcolor=#FA8072
| 517362 ||  || — || September 16, 2006 || Catalina || CSS ||  || align=right data-sort-value="0.94" | 940 m || 
|-id=363 bgcolor=#E9E9E9
| 517363 ||  || — || December 31, 2008 || Kitt Peak || Spacewatch ||  || align=right data-sort-value="0.94" | 940 m || 
|-id=364 bgcolor=#E9E9E9
| 517364 ||  || — || April 5, 2005 || Mount Lemmon || Mount Lemmon Survey ||  || align=right | 1.1 km || 
|-id=365 bgcolor=#E9E9E9
| 517365 ||  || — || May 3, 2014 || Mount Lemmon || Mount Lemmon Survey ||  || align=right | 1.1 km || 
|-id=366 bgcolor=#E9E9E9
| 517366 ||  || — || October 7, 2007 || Mount Lemmon || Mount Lemmon Survey ||  || align=right data-sort-value="0.91" | 910 m || 
|-id=367 bgcolor=#E9E9E9
| 517367 ||  || — || March 11, 2010 || WISE || WISE || KON || align=right | 2.7 km || 
|-id=368 bgcolor=#E9E9E9
| 517368 ||  || — || April 30, 2014 || Haleakala || Pan-STARRS ||  || align=right data-sort-value="0.86" | 860 m || 
|-id=369 bgcolor=#E9E9E9
| 517369 ||  || — || May 7, 2014 || Haleakala || Pan-STARRS ||  || align=right | 1.5 km || 
|-id=370 bgcolor=#E9E9E9
| 517370 ||  || — || January 16, 2004 || Kitt Peak || Spacewatch ||  || align=right | 1.3 km || 
|-id=371 bgcolor=#E9E9E9
| 517371 ||  || — || May 4, 2014 || Kitt Peak || Spacewatch ||  || align=right data-sort-value="0.78" | 780 m || 
|-id=372 bgcolor=#E9E9E9
| 517372 ||  || — || November 25, 2011 || Haleakala || Pan-STARRS ||  || align=right | 1.5 km || 
|-id=373 bgcolor=#E9E9E9
| 517373 ||  || — || December 30, 2007 || Kitt Peak || Spacewatch ||  || align=right | 1.9 km || 
|-id=374 bgcolor=#E9E9E9
| 517374 ||  || — || May 7, 2014 || Haleakala || Pan-STARRS ||  || align=right | 2.1 km || 
|-id=375 bgcolor=#E9E9E9
| 517375 ||  || — || May 7, 2014 || Haleakala || Pan-STARRS ||  || align=right | 1.4 km || 
|-id=376 bgcolor=#E9E9E9
| 517376 ||  || — || December 8, 2012 || Mount Lemmon || Mount Lemmon Survey ||  || align=right | 1.4 km || 
|-id=377 bgcolor=#E9E9E9
| 517377 ||  || — || August 6, 2010 || La Sagra || OAM Obs. ||  || align=right | 1.0 km || 
|-id=378 bgcolor=#E9E9E9
| 517378 ||  || — || January 16, 2013 || Haleakala || Pan-STARRS ||  || align=right | 1.7 km || 
|-id=379 bgcolor=#E9E9E9
| 517379 ||  || — || February 14, 2013 || Haleakala || Pan-STARRS ||  || align=right | 2.0 km || 
|-id=380 bgcolor=#E9E9E9
| 517380 ||  || — || November 3, 2007 || Kitt Peak || Spacewatch ||  || align=right | 1.4 km || 
|-id=381 bgcolor=#E9E9E9
| 517381 ||  || — || February 8, 2013 || Haleakala || Pan-STARRS || WIT || align=right data-sort-value="0.90" | 900 m || 
|-id=382 bgcolor=#E9E9E9
| 517382 ||  || — || May 24, 2014 || Mount Lemmon || Mount Lemmon Survey ||  || align=right | 1.4 km || 
|-id=383 bgcolor=#E9E9E9
| 517383 ||  || — || May 17, 2010 || La Sagra || OAM Obs. ||  || align=right | 1.3 km || 
|-id=384 bgcolor=#E9E9E9
| 517384 ||  || — || April 30, 2014 || Catalina || CSS ||  || align=right data-sort-value="0.90" | 900 m || 
|-id=385 bgcolor=#E9E9E9
| 517385 ||  || — || March 17, 2005 || Kitt Peak || Spacewatch ||  || align=right | 1.1 km || 
|-id=386 bgcolor=#E9E9E9
| 517386 ||  || — || May 23, 2014 || Haleakala || Pan-STARRS ||  || align=right | 2.7 km || 
|-id=387 bgcolor=#E9E9E9
| 517387 ||  || — || June 23, 2010 || Mount Lemmon || Mount Lemmon Survey || JUN || align=right data-sort-value="0.97" | 970 m || 
|-id=388 bgcolor=#E9E9E9
| 517388 ||  || — || August 19, 2006 || Kitt Peak || Spacewatch ||  || align=right | 1.2 km || 
|-id=389 bgcolor=#E9E9E9
| 517389 ||  || — || May 21, 2014 || Haleakala || Pan-STARRS ||  || align=right | 2.0 km || 
|-id=390 bgcolor=#E9E9E9
| 517390 ||  || — || January 13, 2008 || Kitt Peak || Spacewatch ||  || align=right | 2.0 km || 
|-id=391 bgcolor=#E9E9E9
| 517391 ||  || — || May 28, 2014 || Haleakala || Pan-STARRS ||  || align=right | 1.6 km || 
|-id=392 bgcolor=#E9E9E9
| 517392 ||  || — || August 13, 2010 || Kitt Peak || Spacewatch ||  || align=right | 1.8 km || 
|-id=393 bgcolor=#E9E9E9
| 517393 ||  || — || November 15, 2007 || Mount Lemmon || Mount Lemmon Survey ||  || align=right | 1.5 km || 
|-id=394 bgcolor=#E9E9E9
| 517394 ||  || — || December 23, 2012 || Haleakala || Pan-STARRS ||  || align=right | 1.8 km || 
|-id=395 bgcolor=#d6d6d6
| 517395 ||  || — || September 25, 2009 || Mount Lemmon || Mount Lemmon Survey || Tj (2.98) || align=right | 3.4 km || 
|-id=396 bgcolor=#E9E9E9
| 517396 ||  || — || June 13, 2010 || WISE || WISE ||  || align=right | 3.0 km || 
|-id=397 bgcolor=#E9E9E9
| 517397 ||  || — || February 20, 2001 || Kitt Peak || Spacewatch ||  || align=right data-sort-value="0.90" | 900 m || 
|-id=398 bgcolor=#E9E9E9
| 517398 ||  || — || February 2, 2005 || Kitt Peak || Spacewatch ||  || align=right data-sort-value="0.88" | 880 m || 
|-id=399 bgcolor=#E9E9E9
| 517399 ||  || — || June 5, 1997 || Kitt Peak || Spacewatch ||  || align=right | 1.5 km || 
|-id=400 bgcolor=#E9E9E9
| 517400 ||  || — || October 24, 2011 || Mount Lemmon || Mount Lemmon Survey ||  || align=right | 1.1 km || 
|}

517401–517500 

|-bgcolor=#E9E9E9
| 517401 ||  || — || February 8, 2013 || Haleakala || Pan-STARRS ||  || align=right | 1.2 km || 
|-id=402 bgcolor=#E9E9E9
| 517402 ||  || — || February 16, 2010 || WISE || WISE ||  || align=right | 2.9 km || 
|-id=403 bgcolor=#E9E9E9
| 517403 ||  || — || September 26, 2006 || Kitt Peak || Spacewatch ||  || align=right | 1.6 km || 
|-id=404 bgcolor=#E9E9E9
| 517404 ||  || — || March 2, 2010 || WISE || WISE ||  || align=right | 1.0 km || 
|-id=405 bgcolor=#E9E9E9
| 517405 ||  || — || June 2, 2014 || Mount Lemmon || Mount Lemmon Survey ||  || align=right | 2.2 km || 
|-id=406 bgcolor=#E9E9E9
| 517406 ||  || — || May 5, 2014 || Haleakala || Pan-STARRS ||  || align=right | 1.3 km || 
|-id=407 bgcolor=#E9E9E9
| 517407 ||  || — || July 1, 2010 || WISE || WISE ||  || align=right | 2.7 km || 
|-id=408 bgcolor=#E9E9E9
| 517408 ||  || — || May 27, 2014 || Mount Lemmon || Mount Lemmon Survey ||  || align=right | 2.2 km || 
|-id=409 bgcolor=#E9E9E9
| 517409 ||  || — || May 27, 2014 || Kitt Peak || Spacewatch ||  || align=right data-sort-value="0.94" | 940 m || 
|-id=410 bgcolor=#d6d6d6
| 517410 ||  || — || April 4, 2008 || Catalina || CSS ||  || align=right | 2.7 km || 
|-id=411 bgcolor=#d6d6d6
| 517411 ||  || — || March 28, 2008 || Mount Lemmon || Mount Lemmon Survey ||  || align=right | 2.0 km || 
|-id=412 bgcolor=#d6d6d6
| 517412 ||  || — || April 4, 2008 || Mount Lemmon || Mount Lemmon Survey ||  || align=right | 2.3 km || 
|-id=413 bgcolor=#d6d6d6
| 517413 ||  || — || November 30, 2010 || Mount Lemmon || Mount Lemmon Survey ||  || align=right | 3.2 km || 
|-id=414 bgcolor=#E9E9E9
| 517414 ||  || — || May 10, 2014 || Haleakala || Pan-STARRS ||  || align=right | 1.9 km || 
|-id=415 bgcolor=#E9E9E9
| 517415 ||  || — || May 20, 2014 || Haleakala || Pan-STARRS ||  || align=right | 1.8 km || 
|-id=416 bgcolor=#E9E9E9
| 517416 ||  || — || June 5, 2014 || Catalina || CSS ||  || align=right | 1.6 km || 
|-id=417 bgcolor=#E9E9E9
| 517417 ||  || — || May 7, 2014 || Haleakala || Pan-STARRS ||  || align=right | 1.6 km || 
|-id=418 bgcolor=#E9E9E9
| 517418 ||  || — || October 20, 2006 || Kitt Peak || Spacewatch ||  || align=right | 2.4 km || 
|-id=419 bgcolor=#E9E9E9
| 517419 ||  || — || April 20, 2009 || Mount Lemmon || Mount Lemmon Survey ||  || align=right | 2.5 km || 
|-id=420 bgcolor=#E9E9E9
| 517420 ||  || — || April 11, 2010 || WISE || WISE ||  || align=right | 1.6 km || 
|-id=421 bgcolor=#E9E9E9
| 517421 ||  || — || August 10, 2010 || Kitt Peak || Spacewatch ||  || align=right | 1.8 km || 
|-id=422 bgcolor=#E9E9E9
| 517422 ||  || — || May 14, 2005 || Kitt Peak || Spacewatch ||  || align=right | 1.8 km || 
|-id=423 bgcolor=#E9E9E9
| 517423 ||  || — || September 17, 2006 || Kitt Peak || Spacewatch ||  || align=right | 1.2 km || 
|-id=424 bgcolor=#E9E9E9
| 517424 ||  || — || June 2, 2005 || Catalina || CSS ||  || align=right | 1.8 km || 
|-id=425 bgcolor=#d6d6d6
| 517425 ||  || — || April 26, 2007 || Mount Lemmon || Mount Lemmon Survey ||  || align=right | 3.0 km || 
|-id=426 bgcolor=#E9E9E9
| 517426 ||  || — || January 19, 2012 || Mount Lemmon || Mount Lemmon Survey ||  || align=right | 1.9 km || 
|-id=427 bgcolor=#d6d6d6
| 517427 ||  || — || August 23, 2008 || Siding Spring || SSS || 7:4 || align=right | 4.0 km || 
|-id=428 bgcolor=#d6d6d6
| 517428 ||  || — || April 10, 2013 || Haleakala || Pan-STARRS ||  || align=right | 2.7 km || 
|-id=429 bgcolor=#E9E9E9
| 517429 ||  || — || August 29, 2006 || Kitt Peak || Spacewatch ||  || align=right data-sort-value="0.82" | 820 m || 
|-id=430 bgcolor=#d6d6d6
| 517430 ||  || — || June 24, 2014 || Kitt Peak || Spacewatch ||  || align=right | 3.2 km || 
|-id=431 bgcolor=#d6d6d6
| 517431 ||  || — || December 13, 2006 || Mount Lemmon || Mount Lemmon Survey ||  || align=right | 2.8 km || 
|-id=432 bgcolor=#E9E9E9
| 517432 ||  || — || May 1, 2009 || Kitt Peak || Spacewatch ||  || align=right | 1.5 km || 
|-id=433 bgcolor=#d6d6d6
| 517433 ||  || — || July 6, 2014 || Haleakala || Pan-STARRS ||  || align=right | 2.4 km || 
|-id=434 bgcolor=#E9E9E9
| 517434 ||  || — || March 19, 2013 || Haleakala || Pan-STARRS ||  || align=right | 1.9 km || 
|-id=435 bgcolor=#d6d6d6
| 517435 ||  || — || January 18, 2012 || Mount Lemmon || Mount Lemmon Survey ||  || align=right | 2.4 km || 
|-id=436 bgcolor=#E9E9E9
| 517436 ||  || — || September 25, 2006 || Catalina || CSS ||  || align=right | 1.5 km || 
|-id=437 bgcolor=#d6d6d6
| 517437 ||  || — || January 20, 2012 || Kitt Peak || Spacewatch ||  || align=right | 2.9 km || 
|-id=438 bgcolor=#d6d6d6
| 517438 ||  || — || July 26, 2014 || Haleakala || Pan-STARRS ||  || align=right | 2.4 km || 
|-id=439 bgcolor=#d6d6d6
| 517439 ||  || — || June 27, 2014 || Haleakala || Pan-STARRS ||  || align=right | 2.8 km || 
|-id=440 bgcolor=#E9E9E9
| 517440 ||  || — || June 27, 2014 || Haleakala || Pan-STARRS ||  || align=right | 2.2 km || 
|-id=441 bgcolor=#d6d6d6
| 517441 ||  || — || July 25, 2014 || Haleakala || Pan-STARRS || HYG || align=right | 2.7 km || 
|-id=442 bgcolor=#E9E9E9
| 517442 ||  || — || January 18, 2013 || Kitt Peak || Spacewatch ||  || align=right | 1.4 km || 
|-id=443 bgcolor=#E9E9E9
| 517443 ||  || — || February 28, 2010 || WISE || WISE ||  || align=right data-sort-value="0.98" | 980 m || 
|-id=444 bgcolor=#d6d6d6
| 517444 ||  || — || February 12, 2012 || Mount Lemmon || Mount Lemmon Survey ||  || align=right | 2.1 km || 
|-id=445 bgcolor=#d6d6d6
| 517445 ||  || — || July 27, 2014 || Haleakala || Pan-STARRS ||  || align=right | 3.0 km || 
|-id=446 bgcolor=#E9E9E9
| 517446 ||  || — || April 29, 2009 || Mount Lemmon || Mount Lemmon Survey ||  || align=right | 2.5 km || 
|-id=447 bgcolor=#d6d6d6
| 517447 ||  || — || March 26, 2007 || Mount Lemmon || Mount Lemmon Survey ||  || align=right | 2.7 km || 
|-id=448 bgcolor=#d6d6d6
| 517448 ||  || — || March 15, 2007 || Kitt Peak || Spacewatch || EOS || align=right | 1.7 km || 
|-id=449 bgcolor=#E9E9E9
| 517449 ||  || — || October 2, 2010 || Mount Lemmon || Mount Lemmon Survey ||  || align=right | 2.0 km || 
|-id=450 bgcolor=#d6d6d6
| 517450 ||  || — || April 10, 2013 || Mount Lemmon || Mount Lemmon Survey ||  || align=right | 2.9 km || 
|-id=451 bgcolor=#d6d6d6
| 517451 ||  || — || September 17, 2003 || Kitt Peak || Spacewatch ||  || align=right | 2.5 km || 
|-id=452 bgcolor=#d6d6d6
| 517452 ||  || — || April 15, 2013 || Haleakala || Pan-STARRS ||  || align=right | 2.8 km || 
|-id=453 bgcolor=#d6d6d6
| 517453 ||  || — || April 15, 2013 || Haleakala || Pan-STARRS ||  || align=right | 2.8 km || 
|-id=454 bgcolor=#d6d6d6
| 517454 ||  || — || October 4, 2004 || Kitt Peak || Spacewatch || EOS || align=right | 1.7 km || 
|-id=455 bgcolor=#d6d6d6
| 517455 ||  || — || November 27, 2010 || Mount Lemmon || Mount Lemmon Survey ||  || align=right | 1.9 km || 
|-id=456 bgcolor=#d6d6d6
| 517456 ||  || — || January 1, 2012 || Mount Lemmon || Mount Lemmon Survey || EOS || align=right | 1.5 km || 
|-id=457 bgcolor=#d6d6d6
| 517457 ||  || — || May 7, 2014 || Haleakala || Pan-STARRS ||  || align=right | 2.9 km || 
|-id=458 bgcolor=#d6d6d6
| 517458 ||  || — || October 26, 2005 || Kitt Peak || Spacewatch ||  || align=right | 2.1 km || 
|-id=459 bgcolor=#d6d6d6
| 517459 ||  || — || January 19, 2012 || Haleakala || Pan-STARRS ||  || align=right | 2.5 km || 
|-id=460 bgcolor=#d6d6d6
| 517460 ||  || — || January 17, 2007 || Kitt Peak || Spacewatch ||  || align=right | 2.5 km || 
|-id=461 bgcolor=#E9E9E9
| 517461 ||  || — || March 12, 2013 || Kitt Peak || Spacewatch ||  || align=right | 1.8 km || 
|-id=462 bgcolor=#d6d6d6
| 517462 ||  || — || July 28, 2008 || Siding Spring || SSS ||  || align=right | 3.0 km || 
|-id=463 bgcolor=#d6d6d6
| 517463 ||  || — || January 22, 2006 || Mount Lemmon || Mount Lemmon Survey ||  || align=right | 2.4 km || 
|-id=464 bgcolor=#d6d6d6
| 517464 ||  || — || July 25, 2014 || Haleakala || Pan-STARRS ||  || align=right | 2.4 km || 
|-id=465 bgcolor=#d6d6d6
| 517465 ||  || — || March 9, 2007 || Mount Lemmon || Mount Lemmon Survey ||  || align=right | 2.4 km || 
|-id=466 bgcolor=#d6d6d6
| 517466 ||  || — || February 14, 2012 || Haleakala || Pan-STARRS ||  || align=right | 2.3 km || 
|-id=467 bgcolor=#d6d6d6
| 517467 ||  || — || February 3, 2012 || Haleakala || Pan-STARRS ||  || align=right | 3.2 km || 
|-id=468 bgcolor=#d6d6d6
| 517468 ||  || — || February 11, 2012 || Mount Lemmon || Mount Lemmon Survey ||  || align=right | 2.6 km || 
|-id=469 bgcolor=#E9E9E9
| 517469 ||  || — || May 4, 2009 || Mount Lemmon || Mount Lemmon Survey ||  || align=right | 2.1 km || 
|-id=470 bgcolor=#d6d6d6
| 517470 ||  || — || April 19, 2013 || Haleakala || Pan-STARRS ||  || align=right | 2.4 km || 
|-id=471 bgcolor=#d6d6d6
| 517471 ||  || — || March 13, 2012 || Mount Lemmon || Mount Lemmon Survey ||  || align=right | 2.7 km || 
|-id=472 bgcolor=#d6d6d6
| 517472 ||  || — || January 31, 2006 || Mount Lemmon || Mount Lemmon Survey ||  || align=right | 2.4 km || 
|-id=473 bgcolor=#d6d6d6
| 517473 ||  || — || April 14, 2008 || Kitt Peak || Spacewatch ||  || align=right | 1.7 km || 
|-id=474 bgcolor=#d6d6d6
| 517474 ||  || — || March 26, 2007 || Mount Lemmon || Mount Lemmon Survey ||  || align=right | 2.3 km || 
|-id=475 bgcolor=#d6d6d6
| 517475 ||  || — || January 30, 2011 || Mount Lemmon || Mount Lemmon Survey ||  || align=right | 3.1 km || 
|-id=476 bgcolor=#d6d6d6
| 517476 ||  || — || October 17, 2003 || Kitt Peak || Spacewatch ||  || align=right | 2.8 km || 
|-id=477 bgcolor=#d6d6d6
| 517477 ||  || — || May 28, 2008 || Kitt Peak || Spacewatch ||  || align=right | 1.9 km || 
|-id=478 bgcolor=#E9E9E9
| 517478 ||  || — || April 1, 2005 || Kitt Peak || Spacewatch ||  || align=right data-sort-value="0.86" | 860 m || 
|-id=479 bgcolor=#d6d6d6
| 517479 ||  || — || September 24, 2009 || Kitt Peak || Spacewatch ||  || align=right | 2.3 km || 
|-id=480 bgcolor=#d6d6d6
| 517480 ||  || — || February 28, 2012 || Haleakala || Pan-STARRS ||  || align=right | 2.7 km || 
|-id=481 bgcolor=#d6d6d6
| 517481 ||  || — || October 15, 2009 || Mount Lemmon || Mount Lemmon Survey ||  || align=right | 1.9 km || 
|-id=482 bgcolor=#d6d6d6
| 517482 ||  || — || September 28, 2009 || Mount Lemmon || Mount Lemmon Survey ||  || align=right | 2.4 km || 
|-id=483 bgcolor=#d6d6d6
| 517483 ||  || — || April 13, 2013 || Haleakala || Pan-STARRS || EOS || align=right | 1.7 km || 
|-id=484 bgcolor=#E9E9E9
| 517484 ||  || — || May 1, 2009 || Mount Lemmon || Mount Lemmon Survey ||  || align=right | 2.0 km || 
|-id=485 bgcolor=#d6d6d6
| 517485 ||  || — || January 19, 2012 || Haleakala || Pan-STARRS || Tj (2.97) || align=right | 3.8 km || 
|-id=486 bgcolor=#d6d6d6
| 517486 ||  || — || May 8, 2013 || Haleakala || Pan-STARRS ||  || align=right | 2.0 km || 
|-id=487 bgcolor=#d6d6d6
| 517487 ||  || — || May 8, 2013 || Haleakala || Pan-STARRS ||  || align=right | 1.8 km || 
|-id=488 bgcolor=#d6d6d6
| 517488 ||  || — || February 7, 2010 || WISE || WISE ||  || align=right | 3.7 km || 
|-id=489 bgcolor=#d6d6d6
| 517489 ||  || — || September 15, 2009 || Kitt Peak || Spacewatch ||  || align=right | 2.5 km || 
|-id=490 bgcolor=#d6d6d6
| 517490 ||  || — || December 22, 2012 || Haleakala || Pan-STARRS ||  || align=right | 2.5 km || 
|-id=491 bgcolor=#d6d6d6
| 517491 ||  || — || August 22, 2014 || Haleakala || Pan-STARRS ||  || align=right | 2.8 km || 
|-id=492 bgcolor=#d6d6d6
| 517492 ||  || — || September 16, 2009 || Mount Lemmon || Mount Lemmon Survey ||  || align=right | 2.2 km || 
|-id=493 bgcolor=#d6d6d6
| 517493 ||  || — || August 22, 2014 || Haleakala || Pan-STARRS ||  || align=right | 2.9 km || 
|-id=494 bgcolor=#d6d6d6
| 517494 ||  || — || March 16, 2012 || Mount Lemmon || Mount Lemmon Survey ||  || align=right | 2.3 km || 
|-id=495 bgcolor=#E9E9E9
| 517495 ||  || — || May 16, 2009 || Kitt Peak || Spacewatch ||  || align=right | 1.4 km || 
|-id=496 bgcolor=#d6d6d6
| 517496 ||  || — || August 25, 2014 || Haleakala || Pan-STARRS ||  || align=right | 2.9 km || 
|-id=497 bgcolor=#d6d6d6
| 517497 ||  || — || April 16, 2013 || Haleakala || Pan-STARRS ||  || align=right | 2.6 km || 
|-id=498 bgcolor=#d6d6d6
| 517498 ||  || — || August 27, 2009 || Kitt Peak || Spacewatch ||  || align=right | 3.1 km || 
|-id=499 bgcolor=#d6d6d6
| 517499 ||  || — || April 30, 2013 || Kitt Peak || Spacewatch ||  || align=right | 2.5 km || 
|-id=500 bgcolor=#d6d6d6
| 517500 ||  || — || November 20, 2009 || Kitt Peak || Spacewatch || THM || align=right | 2.1 km || 
|}

517501–517600 

|-bgcolor=#d6d6d6
| 517501 ||  || — || March 10, 2007 || Kitt Peak || Spacewatch ||  || align=right | 3.0 km || 
|-id=502 bgcolor=#d6d6d6
| 517502 ||  || — || February 28, 2012 || Haleakala || Pan-STARRS ||  || align=right | 2.6 km || 
|-id=503 bgcolor=#d6d6d6
| 517503 ||  || — || January 30, 2011 || Haleakala || Pan-STARRS ||  || align=right | 2.2 km || 
|-id=504 bgcolor=#d6d6d6
| 517504 ||  || — || February 10, 2008 || Kitt Peak || Spacewatch ||  || align=right | 3.0 km || 
|-id=505 bgcolor=#d6d6d6
| 517505 ||  || — || September 15, 2009 || Kitt Peak || Spacewatch ||  || align=right | 2.7 km || 
|-id=506 bgcolor=#d6d6d6
| 517506 ||  || — || October 14, 2009 || Mount Lemmon || Mount Lemmon Survey || VER || align=right | 2.4 km || 
|-id=507 bgcolor=#d6d6d6
| 517507 ||  || — || January 31, 2006 || Mount Lemmon || Mount Lemmon Survey ||  || align=right | 2.4 km || 
|-id=508 bgcolor=#d6d6d6
| 517508 ||  || — || March 17, 2013 || Mount Lemmon || Mount Lemmon Survey ||  || align=right | 2.2 km || 
|-id=509 bgcolor=#d6d6d6
| 517509 ||  || — || October 14, 2009 || Mount Lemmon || Mount Lemmon Survey ||  || align=right | 2.8 km || 
|-id=510 bgcolor=#d6d6d6
| 517510 ||  || — || June 18, 2013 || Haleakala || Pan-STARRS ||  || align=right | 3.4 km || 
|-id=511 bgcolor=#d6d6d6
| 517511 ||  || — || January 12, 2011 || Kitt Peak || Spacewatch ||  || align=right | 3.2 km || 
|-id=512 bgcolor=#d6d6d6
| 517512 ||  || — || August 23, 2014 || Haleakala || Pan-STARRS ||  || align=right | 2.7 km || 
|-id=513 bgcolor=#d6d6d6
| 517513 ||  || — || March 20, 2007 || Mount Lemmon || Mount Lemmon Survey ||  || align=right | 2.2 km || 
|-id=514 bgcolor=#d6d6d6
| 517514 ||  || — || August 31, 2014 || Haleakala || Pan-STARRS ||  || align=right | 2.4 km || 
|-id=515 bgcolor=#d6d6d6
| 517515 ||  || — || February 25, 2010 || WISE || WISE ||  || align=right | 3.7 km || 
|-id=516 bgcolor=#d6d6d6
| 517516 ||  || — || May 15, 2013 || Haleakala || Pan-STARRS ||  || align=right | 2.3 km || 
|-id=517 bgcolor=#d6d6d6
| 517517 ||  || — || May 12, 2013 || Mount Lemmon || Mount Lemmon Survey ||  || align=right | 2.0 km || 
|-id=518 bgcolor=#d6d6d6
| 517518 ||  || — || November 3, 2010 || Mount Lemmon || Mount Lemmon Survey ||  || align=right | 2.7 km || 
|-id=519 bgcolor=#d6d6d6
| 517519 ||  || — || August 22, 2014 || Haleakala || Pan-STARRS || 7:4 || align=right | 2.6 km || 
|-id=520 bgcolor=#d6d6d6
| 517520 ||  || — || September 6, 2008 || Kitt Peak || Spacewatch ||  || align=right | 2.3 km || 
|-id=521 bgcolor=#d6d6d6
| 517521 ||  || — || October 26, 2008 || Mount Lemmon || Mount Lemmon Survey ||  || align=right | 2.6 km || 
|-id=522 bgcolor=#d6d6d6
| 517522 ||  || — || September 28, 2008 || Mount Lemmon || Mount Lemmon Survey ||  || align=right | 2.1 km || 
|-id=523 bgcolor=#d6d6d6
| 517523 ||  || — || September 18, 2003 || Kitt Peak || Spacewatch ||  || align=right | 2.5 km || 
|-id=524 bgcolor=#d6d6d6
| 517524 ||  || — || March 16, 2012 || Kitt Peak || Spacewatch ||  || align=right | 3.0 km || 
|-id=525 bgcolor=#fefefe
| 517525 ||  || — || September 1, 2014 || Mount Lemmon || Mount Lemmon Survey ||  || align=right data-sort-value="0.58" | 580 m || 
|-id=526 bgcolor=#E9E9E9
| 517526 ||  || — || April 7, 2008 || Mount Lemmon || Mount Lemmon Survey ||  || align=right | 1.3 km || 
|-id=527 bgcolor=#d6d6d6
| 517527 ||  || — || August 20, 2014 || Haleakala || Pan-STARRS ||  || align=right | 2.5 km || 
|-id=528 bgcolor=#d6d6d6
| 517528 ||  || — || October 27, 2009 || Mount Lemmon || Mount Lemmon Survey ||  || align=right | 3.0 km || 
|-id=529 bgcolor=#d6d6d6
| 517529 ||  || — || July 26, 2008 || Siding Spring || SSS ||  || align=right | 3.1 km || 
|-id=530 bgcolor=#d6d6d6
| 517530 ||  || — || February 26, 2012 || Mount Lemmon || Mount Lemmon Survey ||  || align=right | 2.8 km || 
|-id=531 bgcolor=#d6d6d6
| 517531 ||  || — || February 26, 2012 || Kitt Peak || Spacewatch ||  || align=right | 3.0 km || 
|-id=532 bgcolor=#FA8072
| 517532 ||  || — || October 25, 2005 || Mount Lemmon || Mount Lemmon Survey ||  || align=right | 3.1 km || 
|-id=533 bgcolor=#d6d6d6
| 517533 ||  || — || October 24, 2009 || Kitt Peak || Spacewatch ||  || align=right | 2.7 km || 
|-id=534 bgcolor=#d6d6d6
| 517534 ||  || — || September 3, 2008 || Kitt Peak || Spacewatch ||  || align=right | 2.8 km || 
|-id=535 bgcolor=#d6d6d6
| 517535 ||  || — || July 25, 2008 || Siding Spring || SSS ||  || align=right | 3.3 km || 
|-id=536 bgcolor=#E9E9E9
| 517536 ||  || — || April 9, 2013 || Haleakala || Pan-STARRS ||  || align=right | 1.7 km || 
|-id=537 bgcolor=#E9E9E9
| 517537 ||  || — || September 21, 2001 || Desert Eagle || W. K. Y. Yeung ||  || align=right | 1.1 km || 
|-id=538 bgcolor=#d6d6d6
| 517538 ||  || — || August 11, 1997 || Kitt Peak || Spacewatch || THM || align=right | 2.0 km || 
|-id=539 bgcolor=#fefefe
| 517539 ||  || — || June 19, 2006 || Mount Lemmon || Mount Lemmon Survey ||  || align=right data-sort-value="0.93" | 930 m || 
|-id=540 bgcolor=#d6d6d6
| 517540 ||  || — || September 20, 2014 || Haleakala || Pan-STARRS ||  || align=right | 2.3 km || 
|-id=541 bgcolor=#fefefe
| 517541 ||  || — || January 3, 2012 || Kitt Peak || Spacewatch ||  || align=right data-sort-value="0.74" | 740 m || 
|-id=542 bgcolor=#FA8072
| 517542 ||  || — || September 23, 2014 || Kitt Peak || Spacewatch ||  || align=right data-sort-value="0.48" | 480 m || 
|-id=543 bgcolor=#E9E9E9
| 517543 ||  || — || March 5, 2008 || Mount Lemmon || Mount Lemmon Survey ||  || align=right | 2.1 km || 
|-id=544 bgcolor=#d6d6d6
| 517544 ||  || — || March 5, 2010 || WISE || WISE || Tj (2.98) || align=right | 4.7 km || 
|-id=545 bgcolor=#d6d6d6
| 517545 ||  || — || September 17, 2009 || Kitt Peak || Spacewatch ||  || align=right | 2.5 km || 
|-id=546 bgcolor=#d6d6d6
| 517546 ||  || — || September 22, 2008 || Catalina || CSS ||  || align=right | 3.5 km || 
|-id=547 bgcolor=#d6d6d6
| 517547 ||  || — || February 26, 2007 || Mount Lemmon || Mount Lemmon Survey ||  || align=right | 3.6 km || 
|-id=548 bgcolor=#d6d6d6
| 517548 ||  || — || August 4, 2003 || Kitt Peak || Spacewatch ||  || align=right | 3.7 km || 
|-id=549 bgcolor=#fefefe
| 517549 ||  || — || January 16, 2008 || Kitt Peak || Spacewatch ||  || align=right data-sort-value="0.78" | 780 m || 
|-id=550 bgcolor=#d6d6d6
| 517550 ||  || — || February 20, 2012 || Haleakala || Pan-STARRS ||  || align=right | 3.5 km || 
|-id=551 bgcolor=#fefefe
| 517551 ||  || — || May 26, 2003 || Kitt Peak || Spacewatch || H || align=right data-sort-value="0.68" | 680 m || 
|-id=552 bgcolor=#d6d6d6
| 517552 ||  || — || February 4, 2005 || Mount Lemmon || Mount Lemmon Survey ||  || align=right | 3.1 km || 
|-id=553 bgcolor=#d6d6d6
| 517553 ||  || — || September 6, 2008 || Catalina || CSS ||  || align=right | 2.6 km || 
|-id=554 bgcolor=#d6d6d6
| 517554 ||  || — || February 19, 2010 || Kitt Peak || Spacewatch ||  || align=right | 2.3 km || 
|-id=555 bgcolor=#d6d6d6
| 517555 ||  || — || September 29, 2014 || Haleakala || Pan-STARRS ||  || align=right | 2.2 km || 
|-id=556 bgcolor=#d6d6d6
| 517556 ||  || — || September 21, 2008 || Catalina || CSS ||  || align=right | 2.7 km || 
|-id=557 bgcolor=#d6d6d6
| 517557 ||  || — || October 19, 2003 || Kitt Peak || Spacewatch ||  || align=right | 2.4 km || 
|-id=558 bgcolor=#E9E9E9
| 517558 ||  || — || November 19, 2006 || Kitt Peak || Spacewatch ||  || align=right data-sort-value="0.71" | 710 m || 
|-id=559 bgcolor=#d6d6d6
| 517559 ||  || — || March 15, 2007 || Mount Lemmon || Mount Lemmon Survey ||  || align=right | 3.8 km || 
|-id=560 bgcolor=#d6d6d6
| 517560 ||  || — || October 12, 2009 || Mount Lemmon || Mount Lemmon Survey ||  || align=right | 2.5 km || 
|-id=561 bgcolor=#FA8072
| 517561 ||  || — || April 28, 2008 || Kitt Peak || Spacewatch || H || align=right data-sort-value="0.52" | 520 m || 
|-id=562 bgcolor=#d6d6d6
| 517562 ||  || — || April 19, 2007 || Mount Lemmon || Mount Lemmon Survey ||  || align=right | 3.1 km || 
|-id=563 bgcolor=#E9E9E9
| 517563 ||  || — || June 13, 2005 || Mount Lemmon || Mount Lemmon Survey ||  || align=right | 1.1 km || 
|-id=564 bgcolor=#fefefe
| 517564 ||  || — || August 31, 2014 || Haleakala || Pan-STARRS ||  || align=right data-sort-value="0.71" | 710 m || 
|-id=565 bgcolor=#fefefe
| 517565 ||  || — || September 14, 2007 || Mount Lemmon || Mount Lemmon Survey ||  || align=right data-sort-value="0.57" | 570 m || 
|-id=566 bgcolor=#d6d6d6
| 517566 ||  || — || September 22, 2003 || Kitt Peak || Spacewatch ||  || align=right | 1.8 km || 
|-id=567 bgcolor=#d6d6d6
| 517567 ||  || — || October 3, 1997 || Kitt Peak || Spacewatch ||  || align=right | 3.3 km || 
|-id=568 bgcolor=#d6d6d6
| 517568 ||  || — || July 13, 2013 || Haleakala || Pan-STARRS ||  || align=right | 2.3 km || 
|-id=569 bgcolor=#d6d6d6
| 517569 ||  || — || April 22, 2007 || Kitt Peak || Spacewatch ||  || align=right | 2.5 km || 
|-id=570 bgcolor=#d6d6d6
| 517570 ||  || — || October 29, 2003 || Kitt Peak || Spacewatch ||  || align=right | 2.2 km || 
|-id=571 bgcolor=#fefefe
| 517571 ||  || — || September 30, 2003 || Kitt Peak || Spacewatch ||  || align=right data-sort-value="0.74" | 740 m || 
|-id=572 bgcolor=#d6d6d6
| 517572 ||  || — || November 19, 2003 || Kitt Peak || Spacewatch ||  || align=right | 2.7 km || 
|-id=573 bgcolor=#fefefe
| 517573 ||  || — || March 8, 2005 || Mount Lemmon || Mount Lemmon Survey ||  || align=right data-sort-value="0.82" | 820 m || 
|-id=574 bgcolor=#C2FFFF
| 517574 ||  || — || February 25, 2006 || Mount Lemmon || Mount Lemmon Survey || L5 || align=right | 7.0 km || 
|-id=575 bgcolor=#E9E9E9
| 517575 ||  || — || December 2, 2005 || Catalina || CSS ||  || align=right | 2.0 km || 
|-id=576 bgcolor=#fefefe
| 517576 ||  || — || October 10, 2010 || Kitt Peak || Spacewatch ||  || align=right data-sort-value="0.73" | 730 m || 
|-id=577 bgcolor=#E9E9E9
| 517577 ||  || — || November 11, 2006 || Kitt Peak || Spacewatch ||  || align=right data-sort-value="0.98" | 980 m || 
|-id=578 bgcolor=#E9E9E9
| 517578 ||  || — || October 8, 1993 || Kitt Peak || Spacewatch ||  || align=right | 1.0 km || 
|-id=579 bgcolor=#fefefe
| 517579 ||  || — || March 17, 2013 || Mount Lemmon || Mount Lemmon Survey || H || align=right data-sort-value="0.62" | 620 m || 
|-id=580 bgcolor=#fefefe
| 517580 ||  || — || October 10, 2007 || Mount Lemmon || Mount Lemmon Survey ||  || align=right data-sort-value="0.59" | 590 m || 
|-id=581 bgcolor=#d6d6d6
| 517581 ||  || — || April 19, 2012 || Mount Lemmon || Mount Lemmon Survey ||  || align=right | 2.7 km || 
|-id=582 bgcolor=#d6d6d6
| 517582 ||  || — || October 21, 2003 || Kitt Peak || Spacewatch ||  || align=right | 2.7 km || 
|-id=583 bgcolor=#fefefe
| 517583 ||  || — || October 23, 2014 || Kitt Peak || Spacewatch ||  || align=right data-sort-value="0.62" | 620 m || 
|-id=584 bgcolor=#fefefe
| 517584 ||  || — || November 5, 2007 || Kitt Peak || Spacewatch ||  || align=right data-sort-value="0.58" | 580 m || 
|-id=585 bgcolor=#E9E9E9
| 517585 ||  || — || December 2, 2010 || Mount Lemmon || Mount Lemmon Survey ||  || align=right data-sort-value="0.94" | 940 m || 
|-id=586 bgcolor=#E9E9E9
| 517586 ||  || — || March 29, 2008 || Kitt Peak || Spacewatch ||  || align=right | 1.6 km || 
|-id=587 bgcolor=#fefefe
| 517587 ||  || — || January 10, 2008 || Mount Lemmon || Mount Lemmon Survey ||  || align=right data-sort-value="0.77" | 770 m || 
|-id=588 bgcolor=#fefefe
| 517588 ||  || — || August 31, 2014 || Haleakala || Pan-STARRS ||  || align=right data-sort-value="0.78" | 780 m || 
|-id=589 bgcolor=#fefefe
| 517589 ||  || — || February 27, 2009 || Kitt Peak || Spacewatch ||  || align=right data-sort-value="0.69" | 690 m || 
|-id=590 bgcolor=#d6d6d6
| 517590 ||  || — || July 16, 2013 || Haleakala || Pan-STARRS ||  || align=right | 2.1 km || 
|-id=591 bgcolor=#fefefe
| 517591 ||  || — || February 27, 2009 || Catalina || CSS ||  || align=right data-sort-value="0.72" | 720 m || 
|-id=592 bgcolor=#C2FFFF
| 517592 ||  || — || April 7, 2008 || Kitt Peak || Spacewatch || L5 || align=right | 9.8 km || 
|-id=593 bgcolor=#E9E9E9
| 517593 ||  || — || September 15, 2009 || Kitt Peak || Spacewatch ||  || align=right | 1.9 km || 
|-id=594 bgcolor=#C2FFFF
| 517594 ||  || — || October 11, 2012 || Mount Lemmon || Mount Lemmon Survey || n.a. || align=right | 7.3 km || 
|-id=595 bgcolor=#C2FFFF
| 517595 ||  || — || October 3, 2013 || Haleakala || Pan-STARRS || L5 || align=right | 7.8 km || 
|-id=596 bgcolor=#d6d6d6
| 517596 ||  || — || October 7, 2008 || Mount Lemmon || Mount Lemmon Survey ||  || align=right | 2.5 km || 
|-id=597 bgcolor=#fefefe
| 517597 ||  || — || November 23, 2014 || Haleakala || Pan-STARRS || H || align=right data-sort-value="0.59" | 590 m || 
|-id=598 bgcolor=#E9E9E9
| 517598 ||  || — || October 5, 2005 || Catalina || CSS ||  || align=right | 2.7 km || 
|-id=599 bgcolor=#fefefe
| 517599 ||  || — || October 3, 2014 || Haleakala || Pan-STARRS || H || align=right data-sort-value="0.62" | 620 m || 
|-id=600 bgcolor=#fefefe
| 517600 ||  || — || November 27, 2014 || Mount Lemmon || Mount Lemmon Survey || H || align=right data-sort-value="0.71" | 710 m || 
|}

517601–517700 

|-bgcolor=#fefefe
| 517601 ||  || — || May 27, 2008 || Kitt Peak || Spacewatch || H || align=right data-sort-value="0.65" | 650 m || 
|-id=602 bgcolor=#fefefe
| 517602 ||  || — || October 7, 2010 || Kitt Peak || Spacewatch ||  || align=right data-sort-value="0.67" | 670 m || 
|-id=603 bgcolor=#E9E9E9
| 517603 ||  || — || October 22, 2005 || Kitt Peak || Spacewatch ||  || align=right | 1.2 km || 
|-id=604 bgcolor=#d6d6d6
| 517604 ||  || — || December 31, 2008 || Catalina || CSS ||  || align=right | 3.9 km || 
|-id=605 bgcolor=#E9E9E9
| 517605 ||  || — || September 28, 2013 || Mount Lemmon || Mount Lemmon Survey ||  || align=right | 1.7 km || 
|-id=606 bgcolor=#d6d6d6
| 517606 ||  || — || August 23, 2007 || Kitt Peak || Spacewatch ||  || align=right | 2.9 km || 
|-id=607 bgcolor=#fefefe
| 517607 ||  || — || November 28, 2014 || Haleakala || Pan-STARRS ||  || align=right data-sort-value="0.89" | 890 m || 
|-id=608 bgcolor=#d6d6d6
| 517608 ||  || — || October 14, 2013 || Kitt Peak || Spacewatch ||  || align=right | 2.8 km || 
|-id=609 bgcolor=#d6d6d6
| 517609 ||  || — || January 30, 2011 || Haleakala || Pan-STARRS ||  || align=right | 3.3 km || 
|-id=610 bgcolor=#d6d6d6
| 517610 ||  || — || May 12, 2012 || Mount Lemmon || Mount Lemmon Survey ||  || align=right | 3.4 km || 
|-id=611 bgcolor=#d6d6d6
| 517611 ||  || — || April 30, 2006 || Kitt Peak || Spacewatch ||  || align=right | 2.6 km || 
|-id=612 bgcolor=#d6d6d6
| 517612 ||  || — || March 27, 2011 || Mount Lemmon || Mount Lemmon Survey ||  || align=right | 3.1 km || 
|-id=613 bgcolor=#d6d6d6
| 517613 ||  || — || September 9, 2008 || Mount Lemmon || Mount Lemmon Survey ||  || align=right | 2.5 km || 
|-id=614 bgcolor=#E9E9E9
| 517614 ||  || — || November 23, 2014 || Haleakala || Pan-STARRS ||  || align=right | 1.3 km || 
|-id=615 bgcolor=#d6d6d6
| 517615 ||  || — || September 29, 2008 || Mount Lemmon || Mount Lemmon Survey ||  || align=right | 2.6 km || 
|-id=616 bgcolor=#d6d6d6
| 517616 ||  || — || November 28, 2014 || Haleakala || Pan-STARRS ||  || align=right | 3.4 km || 
|-id=617 bgcolor=#d6d6d6
| 517617 ||  || — || November 29, 2014 || Haleakala || Pan-STARRS ||  || align=right | 2.5 km || 
|-id=618 bgcolor=#fefefe
| 517618 ||  || — || December 13, 2006 || Anderson Mesa || LONEOS || H || align=right | 1.0 km || 
|-id=619 bgcolor=#C2FFFF
| 517619 ||  || — || November 4, 2014 || Mount Lemmon || Mount Lemmon Survey || L5 || align=right | 7.4 km || 
|-id=620 bgcolor=#fefefe
| 517620 ||  || — || December 1, 2014 || Haleakala || Pan-STARRS || H || align=right data-sort-value="0.65" | 650 m || 
|-id=621 bgcolor=#E9E9E9
| 517621 ||  || — || October 27, 2009 || Mount Lemmon || Mount Lemmon Survey ||  || align=right | 2.2 km || 
|-id=622 bgcolor=#fefefe
| 517622 ||  || — || June 18, 2013 || Haleakala || Pan-STARRS ||  || align=right data-sort-value="0.68" | 680 m || 
|-id=623 bgcolor=#E9E9E9
| 517623 ||  || — || September 30, 2014 || Mount Lemmon || Mount Lemmon Survey ||  || align=right | 1.8 km || 
|-id=624 bgcolor=#fefefe
| 517624 ||  || — || April 27, 2012 || Haleakala || Pan-STARRS ||  || align=right data-sort-value="0.75" | 750 m || 
|-id=625 bgcolor=#fefefe
| 517625 ||  || — || November 27, 2009 || Mount Lemmon || Mount Lemmon Survey || H || align=right data-sort-value="0.63" | 630 m || 
|-id=626 bgcolor=#E9E9E9
| 517626 ||  || — || November 3, 2010 || Mount Lemmon || Mount Lemmon Survey ||  || align=right | 1.6 km || 
|-id=627 bgcolor=#fefefe
| 517627 ||  || — || December 20, 2014 || Haleakala || Pan-STARRS ||  || align=right data-sort-value="0.65" | 650 m || 
|-id=628 bgcolor=#fefefe
| 517628 ||  || — || September 1, 2008 || Siding Spring || SSS || H || align=right data-sort-value="0.82" | 820 m || 
|-id=629 bgcolor=#fefefe
| 517629 ||  || — || November 19, 2003 || Kitt Peak || Spacewatch || H || align=right data-sort-value="0.57" | 570 m || 
|-id=630 bgcolor=#E9E9E9
| 517630 ||  || — || March 14, 2011 || Mount Lemmon || Mount Lemmon Survey ||  || align=right | 2.0 km || 
|-id=631 bgcolor=#d6d6d6
| 517631 ||  || — || December 21, 2014 || Haleakala || Pan-STARRS ||  || align=right | 1.7 km || 
|-id=632 bgcolor=#E9E9E9
| 517632 ||  || — || May 6, 2011 || Kitt Peak || Spacewatch ||  || align=right | 2.3 km || 
|-id=633 bgcolor=#d6d6d6
| 517633 ||  || — || September 29, 2008 || Mount Lemmon || Mount Lemmon Survey ||  || align=right | 2.2 km || 
|-id=634 bgcolor=#E9E9E9
| 517634 ||  || — || September 24, 2008 || Mount Lemmon || Mount Lemmon Survey ||  || align=right | 1.8 km || 
|-id=635 bgcolor=#fefefe
| 517635 ||  || — || June 12, 2011 || Haleakala || Pan-STARRS || H || align=right data-sort-value="0.62" | 620 m || 
|-id=636 bgcolor=#E9E9E9
| 517636 ||  || — || December 10, 2010 || Mount Lemmon || Mount Lemmon Survey ||  || align=right | 1.2 km || 
|-id=637 bgcolor=#d6d6d6
| 517637 ||  || — || April 24, 2011 || Kitt Peak || Spacewatch ||  || align=right | 3.1 km || 
|-id=638 bgcolor=#fefefe
| 517638 ||  || — || March 31, 2004 || Kitt Peak || Spacewatch ||  || align=right data-sort-value="0.76" | 760 m || 
|-id=639 bgcolor=#d6d6d6
| 517639 ||  || — || October 2, 2008 || Catalina || CSS ||  || align=right | 3.5 km || 
|-id=640 bgcolor=#E9E9E9
| 517640 ||  || — || October 5, 2013 || Haleakala || Pan-STARRS ||  || align=right | 1.7 km || 
|-id=641 bgcolor=#fefefe
| 517641 ||  || — || February 21, 2007 || Mount Lemmon || Mount Lemmon Survey || H || align=right data-sort-value="0.65" | 650 m || 
|-id=642 bgcolor=#fefefe
| 517642 ||  || — || January 16, 2015 || Haleakala || Pan-STARRS || H || align=right data-sort-value="0.71" | 710 m || 
|-id=643 bgcolor=#fefefe
| 517643 ||  || — || January 27, 2007 || Mount Lemmon || Mount Lemmon Survey || H || align=right data-sort-value="0.49" | 490 m || 
|-id=644 bgcolor=#fefefe
| 517644 ||  || — || January 18, 2015 || Haleakala || Pan-STARRS || H || align=right data-sort-value="0.58" | 580 m || 
|-id=645 bgcolor=#fefefe
| 517645 ||  || — || June 17, 2005 || Kitt Peak || Spacewatch || H || align=right data-sort-value="0.73" | 730 m || 
|-id=646 bgcolor=#fefefe
| 517646 ||  || — || January 19, 2015 || Mount Lemmon || Mount Lemmon Survey || H || align=right data-sort-value="0.49" | 490 m || 
|-id=647 bgcolor=#E9E9E9
| 517647 ||  || — || February 25, 2006 || Kitt Peak || Spacewatch ||  || align=right | 1.8 km || 
|-id=648 bgcolor=#E9E9E9
| 517648 ||  || — || August 17, 2012 || Haleakala || Pan-STARRS ||  || align=right | 2.0 km || 
|-id=649 bgcolor=#E9E9E9
| 517649 ||  || — || March 6, 2011 || Kitt Peak || Spacewatch ||  || align=right | 1.8 km || 
|-id=650 bgcolor=#E9E9E9
| 517650 ||  || — || August 3, 2008 || Siding Spring || SSS ||  || align=right | 2.4 km || 
|-id=651 bgcolor=#E9E9E9
| 517651 ||  || — || September 6, 2008 || Kitt Peak || Spacewatch ||  || align=right | 1.7 km || 
|-id=652 bgcolor=#E9E9E9
| 517652 ||  || — || October 1, 2013 || Kitt Peak || Spacewatch ||  || align=right | 2.0 km || 
|-id=653 bgcolor=#d6d6d6
| 517653 ||  || — || October 3, 2008 || Mount Lemmon || Mount Lemmon Survey ||  || align=right | 2.2 km || 
|-id=654 bgcolor=#E9E9E9
| 517654 ||  || — || May 19, 2012 || Mount Lemmon || Mount Lemmon Survey ||  || align=right | 1.7 km || 
|-id=655 bgcolor=#E9E9E9
| 517655 ||  || — || October 14, 2013 || Kitt Peak || Spacewatch ||  || align=right | 1.7 km || 
|-id=656 bgcolor=#E9E9E9
| 517656 ||  || — || October 20, 2008 || Mount Lemmon || Mount Lemmon Survey ||  || align=right | 1.6 km || 
|-id=657 bgcolor=#d6d6d6
| 517657 ||  || — || November 19, 2008 || Mount Lemmon || Mount Lemmon Survey ||  || align=right | 1.7 km || 
|-id=658 bgcolor=#d6d6d6
| 517658 ||  || — || September 21, 2012 || Mount Lemmon || Mount Lemmon Survey ||  || align=right | 2.9 km || 
|-id=659 bgcolor=#E9E9E9
| 517659 ||  || — || November 1, 2008 || Mount Lemmon || Mount Lemmon Survey ||  || align=right | 1.8 km || 
|-id=660 bgcolor=#E9E9E9
| 517660 ||  || — || October 4, 2008 || Mount Lemmon || Mount Lemmon Survey ||  || align=right | 2.4 km || 
|-id=661 bgcolor=#E9E9E9
| 517661 ||  || — || November 28, 2013 || Mount Lemmon || Mount Lemmon Survey ||  || align=right | 1.4 km || 
|-id=662 bgcolor=#d6d6d6
| 517662 ||  || — || December 26, 2014 || Haleakala || Pan-STARRS ||  || align=right | 2.6 km || 
|-id=663 bgcolor=#d6d6d6
| 517663 ||  || — || September 27, 2008 || Mount Lemmon || Mount Lemmon Survey ||  || align=right | 2.5 km || 
|-id=664 bgcolor=#d6d6d6
| 517664 ||  || — || November 1, 2008 || Mount Lemmon || Mount Lemmon Survey ||  || align=right | 2.1 km || 
|-id=665 bgcolor=#E9E9E9
| 517665 ||  || — || October 6, 2008 || Mount Lemmon || Mount Lemmon Survey ||  || align=right | 2.1 km || 
|-id=666 bgcolor=#E9E9E9
| 517666 ||  || — || September 24, 2008 || Mount Lemmon || Mount Lemmon Survey ||  || align=right | 1.5 km || 
|-id=667 bgcolor=#d6d6d6
| 517667 ||  || — || October 29, 2008 || Mount Lemmon || Mount Lemmon Survey ||  || align=right | 2.3 km || 
|-id=668 bgcolor=#E9E9E9
| 517668 ||  || — || December 24, 2013 || Mount Lemmon || Mount Lemmon Survey ||  || align=right | 1.3 km || 
|-id=669 bgcolor=#E9E9E9
| 517669 ||  || — || January 31, 2015 || Haleakala || Pan-STARRS ||  || align=right | 1.2 km || 
|-id=670 bgcolor=#fefefe
| 517670 ||  || — || July 16, 2013 || Haleakala || Pan-STARRS || H || align=right data-sort-value="0.58" | 580 m || 
|-id=671 bgcolor=#fefefe
| 517671 ||  || — || August 2, 2008 || Siding Spring || SSS || H || align=right data-sort-value="0.70" | 700 m || 
|-id=672 bgcolor=#d6d6d6
| 517672 ||  || — || January 23, 2010 || WISE || WISE ||  || align=right | 3.0 km || 
|-id=673 bgcolor=#E9E9E9
| 517673 ||  || — || February 10, 2011 || Mount Lemmon || Mount Lemmon Survey ||  || align=right | 1.2 km || 
|-id=674 bgcolor=#fefefe
| 517674 ||  || — || December 16, 2014 || Haleakala || Pan-STARRS || H || align=right data-sort-value="0.58" | 580 m || 
|-id=675 bgcolor=#fefefe
| 517675 ||  || — || October 25, 2008 || Mount Lemmon || Mount Lemmon Survey || H || align=right data-sort-value="0.68" | 680 m || 
|-id=676 bgcolor=#fefefe
| 517676 ||  || — || December 3, 2010 || Mount Lemmon || Mount Lemmon Survey ||  || align=right data-sort-value="0.55" | 550 m || 
|-id=677 bgcolor=#E9E9E9
| 517677 ||  || — || November 9, 2009 || Kitt Peak || Spacewatch ||  || align=right | 1.6 km || 
|-id=678 bgcolor=#E9E9E9
| 517678 ||  || — || November 9, 2013 || Mount Lemmon || Mount Lemmon Survey ||  || align=right | 1.2 km || 
|-id=679 bgcolor=#fefefe
| 517679 ||  || — || February 16, 2012 || Haleakala || Pan-STARRS ||  || align=right data-sort-value="0.65" | 650 m || 
|-id=680 bgcolor=#d6d6d6
| 517680 ||  || — || October 7, 1996 || Kitt Peak || Spacewatch ||  || align=right | 3.2 km || 
|-id=681 bgcolor=#FFC2E0
| 517681 ||  || — || February 22, 2015 || Haleakala || Pan-STARRS || APOPHA || align=right data-sort-value="0.59" | 590 m || 
|-id=682 bgcolor=#fefefe
| 517682 ||  || — || July 9, 2013 || Haleakala || Pan-STARRS || H || align=right data-sort-value="0.67" | 670 m || 
|-id=683 bgcolor=#d6d6d6
| 517683 ||  || — || December 27, 2006 || Mount Lemmon || Mount Lemmon Survey || 3:2 || align=right | 3.9 km || 
|-id=684 bgcolor=#d6d6d6
| 517684 ||  || — || December 22, 1998 || Kitt Peak || Spacewatch ||  || align=right | 2.2 km || 
|-id=685 bgcolor=#E9E9E9
| 517685 ||  || — || January 6, 2010 || Mount Lemmon || Mount Lemmon Survey ||  || align=right | 1.8 km || 
|-id=686 bgcolor=#E9E9E9
| 517686 ||  || — || February 20, 2015 || Haleakala || Pan-STARRS ||  || align=right | 1.8 km || 
|-id=687 bgcolor=#E9E9E9
| 517687 ||  || — || December 4, 2013 || Haleakala || Pan-STARRS ||  || align=right | 1.8 km || 
|-id=688 bgcolor=#E9E9E9
| 517688 ||  || — || October 8, 2008 || Mount Lemmon || Mount Lemmon Survey ||  || align=right | 1.9 km || 
|-id=689 bgcolor=#E9E9E9
| 517689 ||  || — || October 26, 2008 || Mount Lemmon || Mount Lemmon Survey ||  || align=right | 2.1 km || 
|-id=690 bgcolor=#E9E9E9
| 517690 ||  || — || February 26, 2015 || Haleakala || Pan-STARRS ||  || align=right | 1.2 km || 
|-id=691 bgcolor=#E9E9E9
| 517691 ||  || — || December 27, 2009 || Kitt Peak || Spacewatch ||  || align=right | 1.2 km || 
|-id=692 bgcolor=#E9E9E9
| 517692 ||  || — || February 15, 2010 || Mount Lemmon || Mount Lemmon Survey ||  || align=right | 2.2 km || 
|-id=693 bgcolor=#E9E9E9
| 517693 ||  || — || January 30, 2006 || Kitt Peak || Spacewatch ||  || align=right | 1.2 km || 
|-id=694 bgcolor=#E9E9E9
| 517694 ||  || — || November 2, 2008 || Mount Lemmon || Mount Lemmon Survey ||  || align=right | 1.1 km || 
|-id=695 bgcolor=#d6d6d6
| 517695 ||  || — || December 29, 2008 || Mount Lemmon || Mount Lemmon Survey ||  || align=right | 3.3 km || 
|-id=696 bgcolor=#fefefe
| 517696 ||  || — || June 11, 2013 || Mount Lemmon || Mount Lemmon Survey || H || align=right data-sort-value="0.89" | 890 m || 
|-id=697 bgcolor=#fefefe
| 517697 ||  || — || September 6, 2008 || Kitt Peak || Spacewatch || H || align=right data-sort-value="0.77" | 770 m || 
|-id=698 bgcolor=#fefefe
| 517698 ||  || — || February 12, 2012 || Haleakala || Pan-STARRS || H || align=right data-sort-value="0.79" | 790 m || 
|-id=699 bgcolor=#fefefe
| 517699 ||  || — || October 2, 2006 || Mount Lemmon || Mount Lemmon Survey ||  || align=right data-sort-value="0.52" | 520 m || 
|-id=700 bgcolor=#E9E9E9
| 517700 ||  || — || October 10, 2012 || Haleakala || Pan-STARRS ||  || align=right data-sort-value="0.94" | 940 m || 
|}

517701–517800 

|-bgcolor=#E9E9E9
| 517701 ||  || — || May 26, 2007 || Mount Lemmon || Mount Lemmon Survey ||  || align=right data-sort-value="0.89" | 890 m || 
|-id=702 bgcolor=#E9E9E9
| 517702 ||  || — || March 21, 2015 || Haleakala || Pan-STARRS ||  || align=right | 1.5 km || 
|-id=703 bgcolor=#E9E9E9
| 517703 ||  || — || August 7, 2008 || Kitt Peak || Spacewatch ||  || align=right data-sort-value="0.83" | 830 m || 
|-id=704 bgcolor=#E9E9E9
| 517704 ||  || — || October 6, 2008 || Mount Lemmon || Mount Lemmon Survey ||  || align=right | 1.4 km || 
|-id=705 bgcolor=#E9E9E9
| 517705 ||  || — || March 28, 2015 || Haleakala || Pan-STARRS ||  || align=right | 1.3 km || 
|-id=706 bgcolor=#E9E9E9
| 517706 ||  || — || October 11, 2012 || Haleakala || Pan-STARRS ||  || align=right | 1.2 km || 
|-id=707 bgcolor=#E9E9E9
| 517707 ||  || — || June 8, 2011 || Mount Lemmon || Mount Lemmon Survey ||  || align=right | 2.2 km || 
|-id=708 bgcolor=#E9E9E9
| 517708 ||  || — || December 31, 2013 || Kitt Peak || Spacewatch ||  || align=right | 1.4 km || 
|-id=709 bgcolor=#fefefe
| 517709 ||  || — || March 15, 2015 || Haleakala || Pan-STARRS || H || align=right data-sort-value="0.75" | 750 m || 
|-id=710 bgcolor=#fefefe
| 517710 ||  || — || October 4, 2006 || Mount Lemmon || Mount Lemmon Survey ||  || align=right data-sort-value="0.70" | 700 m || 
|-id=711 bgcolor=#fefefe
| 517711 ||  || — || August 17, 2009 || Kitt Peak || Spacewatch ||  || align=right data-sort-value="0.57" | 570 m || 
|-id=712 bgcolor=#d6d6d6
| 517712 ||  || — || May 6, 2010 || Mount Lemmon || Mount Lemmon Survey ||  || align=right | 2.7 km || 
|-id=713 bgcolor=#fefefe
| 517713 ||  || — || August 30, 2013 || Haleakala || Pan-STARRS || H || align=right data-sort-value="0.69" | 690 m || 
|-id=714 bgcolor=#FA8072
| 517714 ||  || — || May 15, 2015 || Haleakala || Pan-STARRS ||  || align=right data-sort-value="0.91" | 910 m || 
|-id=715 bgcolor=#fefefe
| 517715 ||  || — || March 31, 2011 || Haleakala || Pan-STARRS ||  || align=right data-sort-value="0.82" | 820 m || 
|-id=716 bgcolor=#fefefe
| 517716 ||  || — || October 11, 2012 || Mount Lemmon || Mount Lemmon Survey ||  || align=right data-sort-value="0.68" | 680 m || 
|-id=717 bgcolor=#C2E0FF
| 517717 ||  || — || May 20, 2015 || Haleakala || Pan-STARRS || centaurcritical || align=right | 42 km || 
|-id=718 bgcolor=#fefefe
| 517718 ||  || — || December 17, 2007 || Mount Lemmon || Mount Lemmon Survey ||  || align=right data-sort-value="0.77" | 770 m || 
|-id=719 bgcolor=#fefefe
| 517719 ||  || — || November 1, 2013 || Kitt Peak || Spacewatch ||  || align=right data-sort-value="0.72" | 720 m || 
|-id=720 bgcolor=#fefefe
| 517720 ||  || — || April 6, 2008 || Kitt Peak || Spacewatch ||  || align=right data-sort-value="0.68" | 680 m || 
|-id=721 bgcolor=#fefefe
| 517721 ||  || — || April 23, 2007 || Kitt Peak || Spacewatch || V || align=right data-sort-value="0.62" | 620 m || 
|-id=722 bgcolor=#E9E9E9
| 517722 ||  || — || October 7, 2008 || Mount Lemmon || Mount Lemmon Survey ||  || align=right data-sort-value="0.94" | 940 m || 
|-id=723 bgcolor=#fefefe
| 517723 ||  || — || October 26, 2009 || Mount Lemmon || Mount Lemmon Survey ||  || align=right data-sort-value="0.67" | 670 m || 
|-id=724 bgcolor=#fefefe
| 517724 ||  || — || October 27, 2005 || Catalina || CSS ||  || align=right | 1.2 km || 
|-id=725 bgcolor=#fefefe
| 517725 ||  || — || April 14, 2008 || Mount Lemmon || Mount Lemmon Survey ||  || align=right data-sort-value="0.71" | 710 m || 
|-id=726 bgcolor=#FA8072
| 517726 ||  || — || September 17, 2009 || Mount Lemmon || Mount Lemmon Survey ||  || align=right data-sort-value="0.61" | 610 m || 
|-id=727 bgcolor=#fefefe
| 517727 ||  || — || March 27, 2011 || Mount Lemmon || Mount Lemmon Survey ||  || align=right data-sort-value="0.63" | 630 m || 
|-id=728 bgcolor=#E9E9E9
| 517728 ||  || — || November 12, 2013 || Mount Lemmon || Mount Lemmon Survey ||  || align=right | 2.3 km || 
|-id=729 bgcolor=#fefefe
| 517729 ||  || — || March 28, 2008 || Mount Lemmon || Mount Lemmon Survey ||  || align=right data-sort-value="0.64" | 640 m || 
|-id=730 bgcolor=#fefefe
| 517730 ||  || — || September 15, 2012 || Kitt Peak || Spacewatch ||  || align=right data-sort-value="0.58" | 580 m || 
|-id=731 bgcolor=#fefefe
| 517731 ||  || — || June 7, 2008 || Kitt Peak || Spacewatch ||  || align=right data-sort-value="0.62" | 620 m || 
|-id=732 bgcolor=#fefefe
| 517732 ||  || — || June 10, 2011 || Mount Lemmon || Mount Lemmon Survey ||  || align=right data-sort-value="0.85" | 850 m || 
|-id=733 bgcolor=#E9E9E9
| 517733 ||  || — || December 31, 2008 || Kitt Peak || Spacewatch ||  || align=right data-sort-value="0.94" | 940 m || 
|-id=734 bgcolor=#E9E9E9
| 517734 ||  || — || November 5, 2007 || Kitt Peak || Spacewatch ||  || align=right | 1.2 km || 
|-id=735 bgcolor=#FA8072
| 517735 ||  || — || October 18, 2012 || Haleakala || Pan-STARRS ||  || align=right data-sort-value="0.60" | 600 m || 
|-id=736 bgcolor=#fefefe
| 517736 ||  || — || December 31, 2005 || Kitt Peak || Spacewatch ||  || align=right data-sort-value="0.89" | 890 m || 
|-id=737 bgcolor=#fefefe
| 517737 ||  || — || March 20, 2007 || Kitt Peak || Spacewatch ||  || align=right data-sort-value="0.65" | 650 m || 
|-id=738 bgcolor=#E9E9E9
| 517738 ||  || — || September 25, 2011 || Haleakala || Pan-STARRS ||  || align=right | 2.1 km || 
|-id=739 bgcolor=#FA8072
| 517739 ||  || — || September 25, 2008 || Kitt Peak || Spacewatch ||  || align=right data-sort-value="0.78" | 780 m || 
|-id=740 bgcolor=#E9E9E9
| 517740 ||  || — || June 26, 2015 || Haleakala || Pan-STARRS ||  || align=right data-sort-value="0.81" | 810 m || 
|-id=741 bgcolor=#fefefe
| 517741 ||  || — || November 8, 2009 || Kitt Peak || Spacewatch ||  || align=right data-sort-value="0.95" | 950 m || 
|-id=742 bgcolor=#fefefe
| 517742 ||  || — || January 7, 2013 || Haleakala || Pan-STARRS ||  || align=right data-sort-value="0.83" | 830 m || 
|-id=743 bgcolor=#fefefe
| 517743 ||  || — || July 19, 2011 || Haleakala || Pan-STARRS ||  || align=right data-sort-value="0.88" | 880 m || 
|-id=744 bgcolor=#fefefe
| 517744 ||  || — || September 14, 2005 || Catalina || CSS ||  || align=right data-sort-value="0.96" | 960 m || 
|-id=745 bgcolor=#fefefe
| 517745 ||  || — || May 17, 2001 || Kitt Peak || Spacewatch ||  || align=right data-sort-value="0.65" | 650 m || 
|-id=746 bgcolor=#E9E9E9
| 517746 ||  || — || June 27, 2015 || Haleakala || Pan-STARRS ||  || align=right | 2.5 km || 
|-id=747 bgcolor=#d6d6d6
| 517747 ||  || — || January 27, 2012 || Mount Lemmon || Mount Lemmon Survey ||  || align=right | 2.6 km || 
|-id=748 bgcolor=#E9E9E9
| 517748 ||  || — || September 11, 2007 || Mount Lemmon || Mount Lemmon Survey ||  || align=right | 1.2 km || 
|-id=749 bgcolor=#E9E9E9
| 517749 ||  || — || October 23, 2003 || Kitt Peak || Spacewatch ||  || align=right | 2.0 km || 
|-id=750 bgcolor=#fefefe
| 517750 ||  || — || October 22, 2008 || Kitt Peak || Spacewatch ||  || align=right data-sort-value="0.91" | 910 m || 
|-id=751 bgcolor=#E9E9E9
| 517751 ||  || — || February 14, 2010 || WISE || WISE ||  || align=right | 1.8 km || 
|-id=752 bgcolor=#E9E9E9
| 517752 ||  || — || November 3, 2007 || Mount Lemmon || Mount Lemmon Survey ||  || align=right | 1.3 km || 
|-id=753 bgcolor=#fefefe
| 517753 ||  || — || April 1, 2011 || Kitt Peak || Spacewatch ||  || align=right data-sort-value="0.65" | 650 m || 
|-id=754 bgcolor=#fefefe
| 517754 ||  || — || April 6, 2008 || Catalina || CSS ||  || align=right data-sort-value="0.71" | 710 m || 
|-id=755 bgcolor=#fefefe
| 517755 ||  || — || October 10, 2008 || Kitt Peak || Spacewatch ||  || align=right data-sort-value="0.65" | 650 m || 
|-id=756 bgcolor=#fefefe
| 517756 ||  || — || May 19, 2004 || Campo Imperatore || CINEOS ||  || align=right data-sort-value="0.55" | 550 m || 
|-id=757 bgcolor=#fefefe
| 517757 ||  || — || January 5, 2006 || Kitt Peak || Spacewatch ||  || align=right data-sort-value="0.90" | 900 m || 
|-id=758 bgcolor=#fefefe
| 517758 ||  || — || August 24, 2008 || Kitt Peak || Spacewatch ||  || align=right data-sort-value="0.82" | 820 m || 
|-id=759 bgcolor=#E9E9E9
| 517759 ||  || — || September 23, 2011 || Haleakala || Pan-STARRS ||  || align=right data-sort-value="0.81" | 810 m || 
|-id=760 bgcolor=#fefefe
| 517760 ||  || — || October 20, 2008 || Kitt Peak || Spacewatch ||  || align=right data-sort-value="0.68" | 680 m || 
|-id=761 bgcolor=#fefefe
| 517761 ||  || — || June 22, 2011 || Mount Lemmon || Mount Lemmon Survey ||  || align=right data-sort-value="0.68" | 680 m || 
|-id=762 bgcolor=#fefefe
| 517762 ||  || — || May 13, 2011 || Mount Lemmon || Mount Lemmon Survey ||  || align=right data-sort-value="0.71" | 710 m || 
|-id=763 bgcolor=#fefefe
| 517763 ||  || — || January 27, 2006 || Mount Lemmon || Mount Lemmon Survey ||  || align=right data-sort-value="0.90" | 900 m || 
|-id=764 bgcolor=#E9E9E9
| 517764 ||  || — || September 21, 2011 || Catalina || CSS ||  || align=right | 1.0 km || 
|-id=765 bgcolor=#d6d6d6
| 517765 ||  || — || October 13, 2005 || Mount Lemmon || Mount Lemmon Survey ||  || align=right | 2.9 km || 
|-id=766 bgcolor=#fefefe
| 517766 ||  || — || February 21, 2007 || Kitt Peak || Spacewatch ||  || align=right data-sort-value="0.72" | 720 m || 
|-id=767 bgcolor=#E9E9E9
| 517767 ||  || — || January 17, 2013 || Haleakala || Pan-STARRS ||  || align=right data-sort-value="0.79" | 790 m || 
|-id=768 bgcolor=#E9E9E9
| 517768 ||  || — || November 14, 2007 || Kitt Peak || Spacewatch ||  || align=right | 1.5 km || 
|-id=769 bgcolor=#E9E9E9
| 517769 ||  || — || February 22, 2009 || Kitt Peak || Spacewatch ||  || align=right | 1.3 km || 
|-id=770 bgcolor=#fefefe
| 517770 ||  || — || November 3, 2008 || Mount Lemmon || Mount Lemmon Survey ||  || align=right data-sort-value="0.78" | 780 m || 
|-id=771 bgcolor=#E9E9E9
| 517771 ||  || — || January 30, 2009 || Mount Lemmon || Mount Lemmon Survey ||  || align=right data-sort-value="0.94" | 940 m || 
|-id=772 bgcolor=#fefefe
| 517772 ||  || — || January 15, 2010 || Kitt Peak || Spacewatch ||  || align=right data-sort-value="0.79" | 790 m || 
|-id=773 bgcolor=#d6d6d6
| 517773 ||  || — || May 6, 2014 || Haleakala || Pan-STARRS ||  || align=right | 2.2 km || 
|-id=774 bgcolor=#fefefe
| 517774 ||  || — || February 26, 2014 || Haleakala || Pan-STARRS ||  || align=right data-sort-value="0.82" | 820 m || 
|-id=775 bgcolor=#E9E9E9
| 517775 ||  || — || January 6, 2005 || Catalina || CSS ||  || align=right data-sort-value="0.99" | 990 m || 
|-id=776 bgcolor=#d6d6d6
| 517776 ||  || — || July 8, 2014 || Haleakala || Pan-STARRS ||  || align=right | 3.5 km || 
|-id=777 bgcolor=#E9E9E9
| 517777 ||  || — || May 4, 2009 || Mount Lemmon || Mount Lemmon Survey ||  || align=right | 2.7 km || 
|-id=778 bgcolor=#E9E9E9
| 517778 ||  || — || February 4, 2009 || Mount Lemmon || Mount Lemmon Survey ||  || align=right data-sort-value="0.96" | 960 m || 
|-id=779 bgcolor=#fefefe
| 517779 ||  || — || February 16, 2010 || Kitt Peak || Spacewatch ||  || align=right data-sort-value="0.93" | 930 m || 
|-id=780 bgcolor=#fefefe
| 517780 ||  || — || February 26, 2014 || Mount Lemmon || Mount Lemmon Survey ||  || align=right data-sort-value="0.74" | 740 m || 
|-id=781 bgcolor=#fefefe
| 517781 ||  || — || October 30, 2005 || Kitt Peak || Spacewatch ||  || align=right data-sort-value="0.71" | 710 m || 
|-id=782 bgcolor=#fefefe
| 517782 ||  || — || August 3, 2011 || Haleakala || Pan-STARRS ||  || align=right data-sort-value="0.90" | 900 m || 
|-id=783 bgcolor=#fefefe
| 517783 ||  || — || April 16, 2007 || Mount Lemmon || Mount Lemmon Survey ||  || align=right data-sort-value="0.70" | 700 m || 
|-id=784 bgcolor=#fefefe
| 517784 ||  || — || June 11, 2007 || Siding Spring || SSS ||  || align=right | 1.0 km || 
|-id=785 bgcolor=#fefefe
| 517785 ||  || — || February 25, 2007 || Kitt Peak || Spacewatch ||  || align=right data-sort-value="0.84" | 840 m || 
|-id=786 bgcolor=#fefefe
| 517786 ||  || — || February 26, 2014 || Haleakala || Pan-STARRS ||  || align=right data-sort-value="0.85" | 850 m || 
|-id=787 bgcolor=#fefefe
| 517787 ||  || — || March 14, 2011 || Mount Lemmon || Mount Lemmon Survey ||  || align=right data-sort-value="0.65" | 650 m || 
|-id=788 bgcolor=#fefefe
| 517788 ||  || — || June 5, 2011 || Mount Lemmon || Mount Lemmon Survey ||  || align=right data-sort-value="0.86" | 860 m || 
|-id=789 bgcolor=#fefefe
| 517789 ||  || — || October 11, 2004 || Kitt Peak || Spacewatch ||  || align=right data-sort-value="0.74" | 740 m || 
|-id=790 bgcolor=#fefefe
| 517790 ||  || — || June 11, 2011 || Mount Lemmon || Mount Lemmon Survey ||  || align=right data-sort-value="0.82" | 820 m || 
|-id=791 bgcolor=#E9E9E9
| 517791 ||  || — || February 18, 2010 || WISE || WISE ||  || align=right | 3.1 km || 
|-id=792 bgcolor=#fefefe
| 517792 ||  || — || September 9, 2008 || Mount Lemmon || Mount Lemmon Survey ||  || align=right data-sort-value="0.66" | 660 m || 
|-id=793 bgcolor=#fefefe
| 517793 ||  || — || April 13, 2011 || Mount Lemmon || Mount Lemmon Survey ||  || align=right data-sort-value="0.60" | 600 m || 
|-id=794 bgcolor=#E9E9E9
| 517794 ||  || — || January 5, 2013 || Kitt Peak || Spacewatch ||  || align=right data-sort-value="0.88" | 880 m || 
|-id=795 bgcolor=#E9E9E9
| 517795 ||  || — || September 29, 2011 || Mount Lemmon || Mount Lemmon Survey ||  || align=right | 1.8 km || 
|-id=796 bgcolor=#fefefe
| 517796 ||  || — || February 26, 2014 || Haleakala || Pan-STARRS ||  || align=right data-sort-value="0.77" | 770 m || 
|-id=797 bgcolor=#d6d6d6
| 517797 ||  || — || June 15, 2010 || WISE || WISE || NAE || align=right | 2.1 km || 
|-id=798 bgcolor=#fefefe
| 517798 ||  || — || July 28, 2011 || Siding Spring || SSS ||  || align=right data-sort-value="0.98" | 980 m || 
|-id=799 bgcolor=#E9E9E9
| 517799 ||  || — || March 1, 2009 || Mount Lemmon || Mount Lemmon Survey ||  || align=right | 1.2 km || 
|-id=800 bgcolor=#fefefe
| 517800 ||  || — || October 1, 2005 || Kitt Peak || Spacewatch ||  || align=right data-sort-value="0.68" | 680 m || 
|}

517801–517900 

|-bgcolor=#fefefe
| 517801 ||  || — || July 28, 2011 || Haleakala || Pan-STARRS ||  || align=right data-sort-value="0.97" | 970 m || 
|-id=802 bgcolor=#fefefe
| 517802 ||  || — || November 1, 2005 || Kitt Peak || Spacewatch ||  || align=right data-sort-value="0.94" | 940 m || 
|-id=803 bgcolor=#E9E9E9
| 517803 ||  || — || February 17, 2013 || Kitt Peak || Spacewatch ||  || align=right | 2.1 km || 
|-id=804 bgcolor=#fefefe
| 517804 ||  || — || October 8, 2008 || Mount Lemmon || Mount Lemmon Survey ||  || align=right data-sort-value="0.95" | 950 m || 
|-id=805 bgcolor=#E9E9E9
| 517805 ||  || — || May 3, 2014 || Mount Lemmon || Mount Lemmon Survey ||  || align=right | 1.1 km || 
|-id=806 bgcolor=#E9E9E9
| 517806 ||  || — || September 28, 2011 || Mount Lemmon || Mount Lemmon Survey ||  || align=right | 1.6 km || 
|-id=807 bgcolor=#d6d6d6
| 517807 ||  || — || February 16, 2012 || Haleakala || Pan-STARRS ||  || align=right | 2.8 km || 
|-id=808 bgcolor=#fefefe
| 517808 ||  || — || December 9, 2012 || Haleakala || Pan-STARRS ||  || align=right data-sort-value="0.86" | 860 m || 
|-id=809 bgcolor=#E9E9E9
| 517809 ||  || — || November 20, 2006 || Kitt Peak || Spacewatch ||  || align=right | 2.0 km || 
|-id=810 bgcolor=#d6d6d6
| 517810 ||  || — || July 4, 2014 || Haleakala || Pan-STARRS ||  || align=right | 2.7 km || 
|-id=811 bgcolor=#fefefe
| 517811 ||  || — || April 30, 2014 || Haleakala || Pan-STARRS ||  || align=right data-sort-value="0.63" | 630 m || 
|-id=812 bgcolor=#E9E9E9
| 517812 ||  || — || October 24, 2011 || Haleakala || Pan-STARRS ||  || align=right | 1.7 km || 
|-id=813 bgcolor=#d6d6d6
| 517813 ||  || — || August 21, 2015 || Haleakala || Pan-STARRS ||  || align=right | 2.4 km || 
|-id=814 bgcolor=#E9E9E9
| 517814 ||  || — || September 14, 2007 || Kitt Peak || Spacewatch ||  || align=right data-sort-value="0.74" | 740 m || 
|-id=815 bgcolor=#fefefe
| 517815 ||  || — || July 22, 2011 || Haleakala || Pan-STARRS ||  || align=right data-sort-value="0.83" | 830 m || 
|-id=816 bgcolor=#fefefe
| 517816 ||  || — || February 28, 2014 || Haleakala || Pan-STARRS ||  || align=right data-sort-value="0.94" | 940 m || 
|-id=817 bgcolor=#fefefe
| 517817 ||  || — || September 23, 2008 || Mount Lemmon || Mount Lemmon Survey ||  || align=right data-sort-value="0.76" | 760 m || 
|-id=818 bgcolor=#fefefe
| 517818 ||  || — || March 4, 2014 || Haleakala || Pan-STARRS ||  || align=right | 1.2 km || 
|-id=819 bgcolor=#fefefe
| 517819 ||  || — || March 17, 2007 || Kitt Peak || Spacewatch ||  || align=right data-sort-value="0.77" | 770 m || 
|-id=820 bgcolor=#fefefe
| 517820 ||  || — || April 5, 2014 || Haleakala || Pan-STARRS ||  || align=right | 1.2 km || 
|-id=821 bgcolor=#fefefe
| 517821 ||  || — || February 13, 2010 || Mount Lemmon || Mount Lemmon Survey ||  || align=right data-sort-value="0.87" | 870 m || 
|-id=822 bgcolor=#E9E9E9
| 517822 ||  || — || December 5, 2007 || Kitt Peak || Spacewatch ||  || align=right | 1.6 km || 
|-id=823 bgcolor=#E9E9E9
| 517823 ||  || — || February 15, 2013 || Haleakala || Pan-STARRS ||  || align=right | 1.2 km || 
|-id=824 bgcolor=#d6d6d6
| 517824 ||  || — || October 7, 2004 || Kitt Peak || Spacewatch ||  || align=right | 2.6 km || 
|-id=825 bgcolor=#fefefe
| 517825 ||  || — || September 9, 2008 || Mount Lemmon || Mount Lemmon Survey ||  || align=right data-sort-value="0.80" | 800 m || 
|-id=826 bgcolor=#d6d6d6
| 517826 ||  || — || February 28, 2008 || Kitt Peak || Spacewatch ||  || align=right | 1.9 km || 
|-id=827 bgcolor=#d6d6d6
| 517827 ||  || — || January 30, 2006 || Kitt Peak || Spacewatch ||  || align=right | 2.5 km || 
|-id=828 bgcolor=#fefefe
| 517828 ||  || — || August 28, 2011 || Haleakala || Pan-STARRS ||  || align=right data-sort-value="0.86" | 860 m || 
|-id=829 bgcolor=#FFC2E0
| 517829 ||  || — || September 8, 2015 || Haleakala || Pan-STARRS || APO || align=right data-sort-value="0.75" | 750 m || 
|-id=830 bgcolor=#E9E9E9
| 517830 ||  || — || February 14, 2013 || Mount Lemmon || Mount Lemmon Survey ||  || align=right | 2.6 km || 
|-id=831 bgcolor=#fefefe
| 517831 ||  || — || October 9, 2004 || Kitt Peak || Spacewatch ||  || align=right data-sort-value="0.64" | 640 m || 
|-id=832 bgcolor=#d6d6d6
| 517832 ||  || — || December 13, 2006 || Kitt Peak || Spacewatch ||  || align=right | 2.6 km || 
|-id=833 bgcolor=#fefefe
| 517833 ||  || — || July 23, 2015 || Haleakala || Pan-STARRS || NYS || align=right data-sort-value="0.67" | 670 m || 
|-id=834 bgcolor=#d6d6d6
| 517834 ||  || — || February 20, 2012 || Haleakala || Pan-STARRS ||  || align=right | 3.4 km || 
|-id=835 bgcolor=#fefefe
| 517835 ||  || — || November 3, 2004 || Kitt Peak || Spacewatch ||  || align=right data-sort-value="0.70" | 700 m || 
|-id=836 bgcolor=#fefefe
| 517836 ||  || — || August 24, 2008 || Kitt Peak || Spacewatch || V || align=right data-sort-value="0.60" | 600 m || 
|-id=837 bgcolor=#fefefe
| 517837 ||  || — || May 9, 2007 || Anderson Mesa || LONEOS ||  || align=right | 1.0 km || 
|-id=838 bgcolor=#fefefe
| 517838 ||  || — || March 28, 2014 || Mount Lemmon || Mount Lemmon Survey ||  || align=right data-sort-value="0.98" | 980 m || 
|-id=839 bgcolor=#d6d6d6
| 517839 ||  || — || September 14, 2010 || Kitt Peak || Spacewatch ||  || align=right | 3.8 km || 
|-id=840 bgcolor=#d6d6d6
| 517840 ||  || — || May 27, 2014 || Mount Lemmon || Mount Lemmon Survey ||  || align=right | 2.7 km || 
|-id=841 bgcolor=#E9E9E9
| 517841 ||  || — || December 5, 2007 || Mount Lemmon || Mount Lemmon Survey || MAR || align=right | 1.1 km || 
|-id=842 bgcolor=#fefefe
| 517842 ||  || — || April 20, 2007 || Kitt Peak || Spacewatch ||  || align=right data-sort-value="0.75" | 750 m || 
|-id=843 bgcolor=#fefefe
| 517843 ||  || — || September 21, 2011 || Mount Lemmon || Mount Lemmon Survey ||  || align=right data-sort-value="0.86" | 860 m || 
|-id=844 bgcolor=#fefefe
| 517844 ||  || — || February 26, 2014 || Haleakala || Pan-STARRS ||  || align=right data-sort-value="0.75" | 750 m || 
|-id=845 bgcolor=#d6d6d6
| 517845 ||  || — || July 12, 2005 || Kitt Peak || Spacewatch || KOR || align=right | 1.4 km || 
|-id=846 bgcolor=#d6d6d6
| 517846 ||  || — || September 11, 2015 || Haleakala || Pan-STARRS ||  || align=right | 2.3 km || 
|-id=847 bgcolor=#fefefe
| 517847 ||  || — || June 12, 2011 || Mount Lemmon || Mount Lemmon Survey ||  || align=right data-sort-value="0.65" | 650 m || 
|-id=848 bgcolor=#fefefe
| 517848 ||  || — || June 14, 2007 || Kitt Peak || Spacewatch ||  || align=right data-sort-value="0.75" | 750 m || 
|-id=849 bgcolor=#d6d6d6
| 517849 ||  || — || February 28, 2008 || Kitt Peak || Spacewatch || KOR || align=right | 1.1 km || 
|-id=850 bgcolor=#d6d6d6
| 517850 ||  || — || March 28, 2008 || Mount Lemmon || Mount Lemmon Survey || KOR || align=right | 1.2 km || 
|-id=851 bgcolor=#d6d6d6
| 517851 ||  || — || September 11, 2005 || Kitt Peak || Spacewatch ||  || align=right | 2.1 km || 
|-id=852 bgcolor=#d6d6d6
| 517852 ||  || — || March 13, 2007 || Mount Lemmon || Mount Lemmon Survey ||  || align=right | 2.5 km || 
|-id=853 bgcolor=#E9E9E9
| 517853 ||  || — || March 3, 2013 || Mount Lemmon || Mount Lemmon Survey ||  || align=right | 1.7 km || 
|-id=854 bgcolor=#E9E9E9
| 517854 ||  || — || August 18, 2006 || Kitt Peak || Spacewatch ||  || align=right | 2.1 km || 
|-id=855 bgcolor=#d6d6d6
| 517855 ||  || — || October 8, 2005 || Kitt Peak || Spacewatch ||  || align=right | 1.8 km || 
|-id=856 bgcolor=#E9E9E9
| 517856 ||  || — || November 10, 2006 || Kitt Peak || Spacewatch ||  || align=right | 2.0 km || 
|-id=857 bgcolor=#d6d6d6
| 517857 ||  || — || September 11, 2015 || Haleakala || Pan-STARRS ||  || align=right | 2.2 km || 
|-id=858 bgcolor=#E9E9E9
| 517858 ||  || — || September 15, 2006 || Kitt Peak || Spacewatch || EUN || align=right | 1.0 km || 
|-id=859 bgcolor=#d6d6d6
| 517859 ||  || — || February 25, 2007 || Kitt Peak || Spacewatch || EOS || align=right | 1.9 km || 
|-id=860 bgcolor=#d6d6d6
| 517860 ||  || — || August 12, 2015 || Haleakala || Pan-STARRS ||  || align=right | 2.5 km || 
|-id=861 bgcolor=#E9E9E9
| 517861 ||  || — || November 27, 2011 || Kitt Peak || Spacewatch || EUN || align=right | 1.1 km || 
|-id=862 bgcolor=#d6d6d6
| 517862 ||  || — || June 29, 2014 || Haleakala || Pan-STARRS ||  || align=right | 3.2 km || 
|-id=863 bgcolor=#d6d6d6
| 517863 ||  || — || August 12, 2015 || Haleakala || Pan-STARRS ||  || align=right | 2.9 km || 
|-id=864 bgcolor=#d6d6d6
| 517864 ||  || — || February 27, 2012 || Kitt Peak || Spacewatch || EOS || align=right | 1.5 km || 
|-id=865 bgcolor=#d6d6d6
| 517865 ||  || — || September 8, 2015 || Haleakala || Pan-STARRS ||  || align=right | 3.0 km || 
|-id=866 bgcolor=#d6d6d6
| 517866 ||  || — || March 5, 2008 || Mount Lemmon || Mount Lemmon Survey ||  || align=right | 2.3 km || 
|-id=867 bgcolor=#E9E9E9
| 517867 ||  || — || October 16, 2007 || Mount Lemmon || Mount Lemmon Survey ||  || align=right data-sort-value="0.82" | 820 m || 
|-id=868 bgcolor=#E9E9E9
| 517868 ||  || — || May 13, 2009 || Mount Lemmon || Mount Lemmon Survey ||  || align=right | 1.7 km || 
|-id=869 bgcolor=#E9E9E9
| 517869 ||  || — || September 18, 2011 || Mount Lemmon || Mount Lemmon Survey ||  || align=right data-sort-value="0.90" | 900 m || 
|-id=870 bgcolor=#d6d6d6
| 517870 ||  || — || March 1, 2012 || Mount Lemmon || Mount Lemmon Survey ||  || align=right | 2.1 km || 
|-id=871 bgcolor=#d6d6d6
| 517871 ||  || — || February 24, 2012 || Mount Lemmon || Mount Lemmon Survey ||  || align=right | 2.4 km || 
|-id=872 bgcolor=#d6d6d6
| 517872 ||  || — || February 6, 2013 || Kitt Peak || Spacewatch ||  || align=right | 2.3 km || 
|-id=873 bgcolor=#E9E9E9
| 517873 ||  || — || February 2, 2009 || Kitt Peak || Spacewatch ||  || align=right | 1.5 km || 
|-id=874 bgcolor=#d6d6d6
| 517874 ||  || — || February 28, 2012 || Haleakala || Pan-STARRS ||  || align=right | 2.7 km || 
|-id=875 bgcolor=#d6d6d6
| 517875 ||  || — || September 9, 2015 || Haleakala || Pan-STARRS ||  || align=right | 2.5 km || 
|-id=876 bgcolor=#E9E9E9
| 517876 ||  || — || September 3, 2010 || Mount Lemmon || Mount Lemmon Survey ||  || align=right | 1.9 km || 
|-id=877 bgcolor=#d6d6d6
| 517877 ||  || — || June 24, 2014 || Haleakala || Pan-STARRS ||  || align=right | 3.0 km || 
|-id=878 bgcolor=#d6d6d6
| 517878 ||  || — || September 27, 2009 || Mount Lemmon || Mount Lemmon Survey ||  || align=right | 3.1 km || 
|-id=879 bgcolor=#E9E9E9
| 517879 ||  || — || September 9, 2015 || Haleakala || Pan-STARRS ||  || align=right | 1.8 km || 
|-id=880 bgcolor=#d6d6d6
| 517880 ||  || — || March 19, 2013 || Haleakala || Pan-STARRS ||  || align=right | 2.1 km || 
|-id=881 bgcolor=#fefefe
| 517881 ||  || — || March 22, 2014 || Mount Lemmon || Mount Lemmon Survey ||  || align=right data-sort-value="0.73" | 730 m || 
|-id=882 bgcolor=#E9E9E9
| 517882 ||  || — || April 30, 2014 || Haleakala || Pan-STARRS ||  || align=right | 1.7 km || 
|-id=883 bgcolor=#fefefe
| 517883 ||  || — || February 28, 2014 || Haleakala || Pan-STARRS ||  || align=right | 1.0 km || 
|-id=884 bgcolor=#d6d6d6
| 517884 ||  || — || March 6, 2006 || Catalina || CSS ||  || align=right | 5.2 km || 
|-id=885 bgcolor=#E9E9E9
| 517885 ||  || — || March 2, 2009 || Mount Lemmon || Mount Lemmon Survey ||  || align=right | 1.9 km || 
|-id=886 bgcolor=#d6d6d6
| 517886 ||  || — || April 10, 2013 || Haleakala || Pan-STARRS ||  || align=right | 2.1 km || 
|-id=887 bgcolor=#E9E9E9
| 517887 ||  || — || November 3, 2011 || Kitt Peak || Spacewatch ||  || align=right | 1.6 km || 
|-id=888 bgcolor=#E9E9E9
| 517888 ||  || — || October 11, 2007 || Mount Lemmon || Mount Lemmon Survey ||  || align=right data-sort-value="0.71" | 710 m || 
|-id=889 bgcolor=#d6d6d6
| 517889 ||  || — || February 26, 2012 || Mount Lemmon || Mount Lemmon Survey ||  || align=right | 3.2 km || 
|-id=890 bgcolor=#d6d6d6
| 517890 ||  || — || August 5, 2014 || Haleakala || Pan-STARRS || 7:4 || align=right | 2.6 km || 
|-id=891 bgcolor=#d6d6d6
| 517891 ||  || — || October 8, 2004 || Anderson Mesa || LONEOS ||  || align=right | 3.9 km || 
|-id=892 bgcolor=#E9E9E9
| 517892 ||  || — || April 4, 2014 || Kitt Peak || Spacewatch ||  || align=right | 1.3 km || 
|-id=893 bgcolor=#d6d6d6
| 517893 ||  || — || June 29, 2014 || Haleakala || Pan-STARRS ||  || align=right | 2.7 km || 
|-id=894 bgcolor=#d6d6d6
| 517894 ||  || — || August 22, 2014 || Haleakala || Pan-STARRS ||  || align=right | 2.7 km || 
|-id=895 bgcolor=#E9E9E9
| 517895 ||  || — || July 10, 2005 || Kitt Peak || Spacewatch ||  || align=right | 1.9 km || 
|-id=896 bgcolor=#d6d6d6
| 517896 ||  || — || October 17, 1998 || Kitt Peak || Spacewatch ||  || align=right | 3.2 km || 
|-id=897 bgcolor=#E9E9E9
| 517897 ||  || — || May 26, 2014 || Haleakala || Pan-STARRS ||  || align=right | 1.6 km || 
|-id=898 bgcolor=#d6d6d6
| 517898 ||  || — || October 8, 2015 || Haleakala || Pan-STARRS ||  || align=right | 2.5 km || 
|-id=899 bgcolor=#d6d6d6
| 517899 ||  || — || April 11, 2013 || Mount Lemmon || Mount Lemmon Survey ||  || align=right | 3.1 km || 
|-id=900 bgcolor=#d6d6d6
| 517900 ||  || — || August 22, 2014 || Haleakala || Pan-STARRS ||  || align=right | 3.0 km || 
|}

517901–518000 

|-bgcolor=#d6d6d6
| 517901 ||  || — || August 18, 2009 || Kitt Peak || Spacewatch ||  || align=right | 2.9 km || 
|-id=902 bgcolor=#E9E9E9
| 517902 ||  || — || October 26, 2011 || Haleakala || Pan-STARRS ||  || align=right | 1.0 km || 
|-id=903 bgcolor=#E9E9E9
| 517903 ||  || — || October 26, 2011 || Haleakala || Pan-STARRS ||  || align=right data-sort-value="0.90" | 900 m || 
|-id=904 bgcolor=#d6d6d6
| 517904 ||  || — || September 12, 2014 || Haleakala || Pan-STARRS || 7:4 || align=right | 3.1 km || 
|-id=905 bgcolor=#d6d6d6
| 517905 ||  || — || May 16, 2013 || Mount Lemmon || Mount Lemmon Survey ||  || align=right | 3.6 km || 
|-id=906 bgcolor=#d6d6d6
| 517906 ||  || — || July 25, 2014 || Haleakala || Pan-STARRS ||  || align=right | 2.4 km || 
|-id=907 bgcolor=#d6d6d6
| 517907 ||  || — || January 13, 2010 || WISE || WISE ||  || align=right | 4.0 km || 
|-id=908 bgcolor=#d6d6d6
| 517908 ||  || — || March 16, 2012 || Mount Lemmon || Mount Lemmon Survey ||  || align=right | 3.1 km || 
|-id=909 bgcolor=#E9E9E9
| 517909 ||  || — || January 2, 2012 || Mount Lemmon || Mount Lemmon Survey || EUN || align=right | 1.4 km || 
|-id=910 bgcolor=#E9E9E9
| 517910 ||  || — || June 21, 2010 || Mount Lemmon || Mount Lemmon Survey ||  || align=right | 1.4 km || 
|-id=911 bgcolor=#d6d6d6
| 517911 ||  || — || October 8, 2015 || Haleakala || Pan-STARRS ||  || align=right | 2.4 km || 
|-id=912 bgcolor=#E9E9E9
| 517912 ||  || — || April 10, 2010 || Kitt Peak || Spacewatch ||  || align=right data-sort-value="0.90" | 900 m || 
|-id=913 bgcolor=#d6d6d6
| 517913 ||  || — || December 4, 2005 || Kitt Peak || Spacewatch || EOS || align=right | 1.7 km || 
|-id=914 bgcolor=#d6d6d6
| 517914 ||  || — || February 19, 2012 || Kitt Peak || Spacewatch ||  || align=right | 2.8 km || 
|-id=915 bgcolor=#d6d6d6
| 517915 ||  || — || December 1, 2005 || Kitt Peak || Spacewatch || EOS || align=right | 1.8 km || 
|-id=916 bgcolor=#d6d6d6
| 517916 ||  || — || December 9, 2010 || Kitt Peak || Spacewatch ||  || align=right | 2.8 km || 
|-id=917 bgcolor=#fefefe
| 517917 ||  || — || February 25, 2006 || Mount Lemmon || Mount Lemmon Survey ||  || align=right data-sort-value="0.98" | 980 m || 
|-id=918 bgcolor=#fefefe
| 517918 ||  || — || February 26, 2014 || Haleakala || Pan-STARRS ||  || align=right data-sort-value="0.75" | 750 m || 
|-id=919 bgcolor=#d6d6d6
| 517919 ||  || — || November 24, 2006 || Mount Lemmon || Mount Lemmon Survey || KOR || align=right | 1.2 km || 
|-id=920 bgcolor=#E9E9E9
| 517920 ||  || — || October 8, 2007 || Mount Lemmon || Mount Lemmon Survey ||  || align=right data-sort-value="0.82" | 820 m || 
|-id=921 bgcolor=#d6d6d6
| 517921 ||  || — || September 9, 2015 || Haleakala || Pan-STARRS || EOS || align=right | 1.8 km || 
|-id=922 bgcolor=#E9E9E9
| 517922 ||  || — || September 8, 2015 || Haleakala || Pan-STARRS ||  || align=right | 2.3 km || 
|-id=923 bgcolor=#d6d6d6
| 517923 ||  || — || March 5, 2013 || Mount Lemmon || Mount Lemmon Survey ||  || align=right | 2.0 km || 
|-id=924 bgcolor=#d6d6d6
| 517924 ||  || — || September 15, 1993 || Kitt Peak || Spacewatch ||  || align=right | 2.9 km || 
|-id=925 bgcolor=#d6d6d6
| 517925 ||  || — || March 27, 2012 || Mount Lemmon || Mount Lemmon Survey ||  || align=right | 3.1 km || 
|-id=926 bgcolor=#E9E9E9
| 517926 ||  || — || May 16, 2005 || Mount Lemmon || Mount Lemmon Survey ||  || align=right | 1.9 km || 
|-id=927 bgcolor=#E9E9E9
| 517927 ||  || — || March 19, 2013 || Haleakala || Pan-STARRS || AGN || align=right | 1.2 km || 
|-id=928 bgcolor=#E9E9E9
| 517928 ||  || — || October 23, 2006 || Kitt Peak || Spacewatch ||  || align=right | 2.3 km || 
|-id=929 bgcolor=#E9E9E9
| 517929 ||  || — || October 23, 2006 || Kitt Peak || Spacewatch ||  || align=right | 1.9 km || 
|-id=930 bgcolor=#E9E9E9
| 517930 ||  || — || October 13, 2006 || Kitt Peak || Spacewatch ||  || align=right | 2.5 km || 
|-id=931 bgcolor=#d6d6d6
| 517931 ||  || — || February 26, 2008 || Mount Lemmon || Mount Lemmon Survey ||  || align=right | 2.1 km || 
|-id=932 bgcolor=#E9E9E9
| 517932 ||  || — || September 25, 2006 || Kitt Peak || Spacewatch ||  || align=right | 1.9 km || 
|-id=933 bgcolor=#E9E9E9
| 517933 ||  || — || September 17, 2006 || Kitt Peak || Spacewatch ||  || align=right | 2.3 km || 
|-id=934 bgcolor=#d6d6d6
| 517934 ||  || — || July 29, 2010 || WISE || WISE ||  || align=right | 3.9 km || 
|-id=935 bgcolor=#E9E9E9
| 517935 ||  || — || November 5, 2011 || Haleakala || Pan-STARRS || EUN || align=right data-sort-value="0.92" | 920 m || 
|-id=936 bgcolor=#d6d6d6
| 517936 ||  || — || October 2, 2015 || Kitt Peak || Spacewatch || HYG || align=right | 2.7 km || 
|-id=937 bgcolor=#d6d6d6
| 517937 ||  || — || June 3, 2014 || Haleakala || Pan-STARRS ||  || align=right | 3.5 km || 
|-id=938 bgcolor=#d6d6d6
| 517938 ||  || — || September 7, 2015 || XuYi || PMO NEO ||  || align=right | 3.3 km || 
|-id=939 bgcolor=#d6d6d6
| 517939 ||  || — || April 28, 2004 || Kitt Peak || Spacewatch ||  || align=right | 2.6 km || 
|-id=940 bgcolor=#d6d6d6
| 517940 ||  || — || July 29, 2010 || WISE || WISE ||  || align=right | 2.6 km || 
|-id=941 bgcolor=#E9E9E9
| 517941 ||  || — || October 24, 2011 || Kitt Peak || Spacewatch ||  || align=right | 1.4 km || 
|-id=942 bgcolor=#E9E9E9
| 517942 ||  || — || October 24, 2011 || Kitt Peak || Spacewatch || WIT || align=right data-sort-value="0.78" | 780 m || 
|-id=943 bgcolor=#E9E9E9
| 517943 ||  || — || August 27, 2006 || Kitt Peak || Spacewatch ||  || align=right | 1.3 km || 
|-id=944 bgcolor=#E9E9E9
| 517944 ||  || — || January 11, 2008 || Kitt Peak || Spacewatch || AST || align=right | 1.3 km || 
|-id=945 bgcolor=#d6d6d6
| 517945 ||  || — || August 17, 2009 || Siding Spring || SSS ||  || align=right | 3.5 km || 
|-id=946 bgcolor=#d6d6d6
| 517946 ||  || — || November 8, 2010 || Mount Lemmon || Mount Lemmon Survey ||  || align=right | 2.6 km || 
|-id=947 bgcolor=#d6d6d6
| 517947 ||  || — || November 5, 2005 || Mount Lemmon || Mount Lemmon Survey ||  || align=right | 2.2 km || 
|-id=948 bgcolor=#d6d6d6
| 517948 ||  || — || April 7, 2013 || Kitt Peak || Spacewatch ||  || align=right | 2.7 km || 
|-id=949 bgcolor=#d6d6d6
| 517949 ||  || — || September 9, 2015 || Haleakala || Pan-STARRS ||  || align=right | 2.5 km || 
|-id=950 bgcolor=#d6d6d6
| 517950 ||  || — || October 27, 2005 || Kitt Peak || Spacewatch ||  || align=right | 2.1 km || 
|-id=951 bgcolor=#d6d6d6
| 517951 ||  || — || October 15, 2004 || Mount Lemmon || Mount Lemmon Survey || THM || align=right | 2.1 km || 
|-id=952 bgcolor=#E9E9E9
| 517952 ||  || — || November 25, 2006 || Mount Lemmon || Mount Lemmon Survey ||  || align=right | 2.0 km || 
|-id=953 bgcolor=#E9E9E9
| 517953 ||  || — || April 30, 2014 || Haleakala || Pan-STARRS ||  || align=right | 1.5 km || 
|-id=954 bgcolor=#d6d6d6
| 517954 ||  || — || February 3, 2012 || Haleakala || Pan-STARRS || EOS || align=right | 1.9 km || 
|-id=955 bgcolor=#d6d6d6
| 517955 ||  || — || September 21, 2009 || Mount Lemmon || Mount Lemmon Survey || VER || align=right | 2.0 km || 
|-id=956 bgcolor=#E9E9E9
| 517956 ||  || — || August 21, 2015 || Haleakala || Pan-STARRS ||  || align=right | 2.2 km || 
|-id=957 bgcolor=#E9E9E9
| 517957 ||  || — || April 30, 2014 || Haleakala || Pan-STARRS ||  || align=right data-sort-value="0.90" | 900 m || 
|-id=958 bgcolor=#d6d6d6
| 517958 ||  || — || September 14, 2005 || Kitt Peak || Spacewatch ||  || align=right | 2.0 km || 
|-id=959 bgcolor=#d6d6d6
| 517959 ||  || — || October 10, 2015 || Haleakala || Pan-STARRS ||  || align=right | 2.7 km || 
|-id=960 bgcolor=#E9E9E9
| 517960 ||  || — || October 3, 2006 || Mount Lemmon || Mount Lemmon Survey ||  || align=right | 1.9 km || 
|-id=961 bgcolor=#E9E9E9
| 517961 ||  || — || April 30, 2009 || Mount Lemmon || Mount Lemmon Survey ||  || align=right | 2.1 km || 
|-id=962 bgcolor=#d6d6d6
| 517962 ||  || — || October 11, 1999 || Kitt Peak || Spacewatch ||  || align=right | 3.6 km || 
|-id=963 bgcolor=#d6d6d6
| 517963 ||  || — || December 13, 2010 || Kitt Peak || Spacewatch ||  || align=right | 2.9 km || 
|-id=964 bgcolor=#d6d6d6
| 517964 ||  || — || October 9, 2015 || Haleakala || Pan-STARRS ||  || align=right | 2.1 km || 
|-id=965 bgcolor=#d6d6d6
| 517965 ||  || — || January 6, 2006 || Kitt Peak || Spacewatch ||  || align=right | 3.2 km || 
|-id=966 bgcolor=#d6d6d6
| 517966 ||  || — || March 14, 2007 || Kitt Peak || Spacewatch ||  || align=right | 2.6 km || 
|-id=967 bgcolor=#d6d6d6
| 517967 ||  || — || January 25, 2012 || Haleakala || Pan-STARRS ||  || align=right | 3.7 km || 
|-id=968 bgcolor=#fefefe
| 517968 ||  || — || January 10, 2013 || Haleakala || Pan-STARRS ||  || align=right data-sort-value="0.62" | 620 m || 
|-id=969 bgcolor=#d6d6d6
| 517969 ||  || — || March 27, 2012 || Mount Lemmon || Mount Lemmon Survey ||  || align=right | 3.2 km || 
|-id=970 bgcolor=#d6d6d6
| 517970 ||  || — || February 25, 2012 || Mount Lemmon || Mount Lemmon Survey ||  || align=right | 2.0 km || 
|-id=971 bgcolor=#d6d6d6
| 517971 ||  || — || September 6, 2008 || Mount Lemmon || Mount Lemmon Survey || 7:4 || align=right | 3.0 km || 
|-id=972 bgcolor=#d6d6d6
| 517972 ||  || — || September 23, 2009 || Mount Lemmon || Mount Lemmon Survey ||  || align=right | 2.2 km || 
|-id=973 bgcolor=#d6d6d6
| 517973 ||  || — || January 17, 2013 || Haleakala || Pan-STARRS ||  || align=right | 3.5 km || 
|-id=974 bgcolor=#E9E9E9
| 517974 ||  || — || June 24, 2014 || Haleakala || Pan-STARRS ||  || align=right | 1.7 km || 
|-id=975 bgcolor=#d6d6d6
| 517975 ||  || — || April 14, 2013 || Mount Lemmon || Mount Lemmon Survey ||  || align=right | 3.4 km || 
|-id=976 bgcolor=#d6d6d6
| 517976 ||  || — || March 30, 2012 || Mount Lemmon || Mount Lemmon Survey ||  || align=right | 2.8 km || 
|-id=977 bgcolor=#d6d6d6
| 517977 ||  || — || March 20, 2007 || Kitt Peak || Spacewatch ||  || align=right | 2.9 km || 
|-id=978 bgcolor=#E9E9E9
| 517978 ||  || — || March 2, 2009 || Kitt Peak || Spacewatch ||  || align=right | 1.3 km || 
|-id=979 bgcolor=#E9E9E9
| 517979 ||  || — || November 24, 2011 || Mount Lemmon || Mount Lemmon Survey ||  || align=right | 1.4 km || 
|-id=980 bgcolor=#d6d6d6
| 517980 ||  || — || September 18, 2010 || Mount Lemmon || Mount Lemmon Survey ||  || align=right | 2.7 km || 
|-id=981 bgcolor=#d6d6d6
| 517981 ||  || — || January 28, 2000 || Kitt Peak || Spacewatch ||  || align=right | 3.5 km || 
|-id=982 bgcolor=#E9E9E9
| 517982 ||  || — || October 1, 2006 || Kitt Peak || Spacewatch ||  || align=right | 1.9 km || 
|-id=983 bgcolor=#E9E9E9
| 517983 ||  || — || September 28, 2006 || Kitt Peak || Spacewatch ||  || align=right | 1.8 km || 
|-id=984 bgcolor=#d6d6d6
| 517984 ||  || — || March 16, 2007 || Kitt Peak || Spacewatch ||  || align=right | 3.2 km || 
|-id=985 bgcolor=#d6d6d6
| 517985 ||  || — || January 26, 1998 || Kitt Peak || Spacewatch ||  || align=right | 2.3 km || 
|-id=986 bgcolor=#fefefe
| 517986 ||  || — || June 3, 2010 || WISE || WISE ||  || align=right | 1.7 km || 
|-id=987 bgcolor=#E9E9E9
| 517987 ||  || — || March 19, 2009 || Kitt Peak || Spacewatch ||  || align=right | 1.7 km || 
|-id=988 bgcolor=#d6d6d6
| 517988 ||  || — || March 10, 2007 || Mount Lemmon || Mount Lemmon Survey ||  || align=right | 2.8 km || 
|-id=989 bgcolor=#d6d6d6
| 517989 ||  || — || October 18, 2015 || Haleakala || Pan-STARRS ||  || align=right | 2.3 km || 
|-id=990 bgcolor=#E9E9E9
| 517990 ||  || — || February 17, 2013 || Mount Lemmon || Mount Lemmon Survey ||  || align=right | 2.1 km || 
|-id=991 bgcolor=#fefefe
| 517991 ||  || — || May 4, 2014 || Haleakala || Pan-STARRS ||  || align=right data-sort-value="0.89" | 890 m || 
|-id=992 bgcolor=#d6d6d6
| 517992 ||  || — || March 16, 2012 || Mount Lemmon || Mount Lemmon Survey ||  || align=right | 2.5 km || 
|-id=993 bgcolor=#d6d6d6
| 517993 ||  || — || February 25, 2007 || Mount Lemmon || Mount Lemmon Survey ||  || align=right | 2.8 km || 
|-id=994 bgcolor=#d6d6d6
| 517994 ||  || — || December 6, 2010 || Mount Lemmon || Mount Lemmon Survey ||  || align=right | 2.5 km || 
|-id=995 bgcolor=#E9E9E9
| 517995 ||  || — || April 6, 1995 || Kitt Peak || Spacewatch ||  || align=right | 2.0 km || 
|-id=996 bgcolor=#d6d6d6
| 517996 ||  || — || April 18, 2007 || Mount Lemmon || Mount Lemmon Survey ||  || align=right | 2.5 km || 
|-id=997 bgcolor=#d6d6d6
| 517997 ||  || — || August 20, 2014 || Haleakala || Pan-STARRS ||  || align=right | 2.6 km || 
|-id=998 bgcolor=#E9E9E9
| 517998 ||  || — || October 31, 2006 || Mount Lemmon || Mount Lemmon Survey ||  || align=right | 1.8 km || 
|-id=999 bgcolor=#d6d6d6
| 517999 ||  || — || May 7, 2013 || Mount Lemmon || Mount Lemmon Survey ||  || align=right | 3.8 km || 
|-id=000 bgcolor=#d6d6d6
| 518000 ||  || — || October 1, 2005 || Mount Lemmon || Mount Lemmon Survey ||  || align=right | 2.5 km || 
|}

References

External links 
 Discovery Circumstances: Numbered Minor Planets (515001)–(520000) (IAU Minor Planet Center)

0517